

589001–589100 

|-bgcolor=#E9E9E9
| 589001 ||  || — || January 1, 2009 || Kitt Peak || Spacewatch ||  || align=right | 1.9 km || 
|-id=002 bgcolor=#E9E9E9
| 589002 ||  || — || January 18, 2013 || Mount Lemmon || Mount Lemmon Survey ||  || align=right data-sort-value="0.61" | 610 m || 
|-id=003 bgcolor=#fefefe
| 589003 ||  || — || January 3, 2009 || Kitt Peak || Spacewatch ||  || align=right data-sort-value="0.47" | 470 m || 
|-id=004 bgcolor=#E9E9E9
| 589004 ||  || — || January 1, 2009 || Kitt Peak || Spacewatch ||  || align=right | 1.7 km || 
|-id=005 bgcolor=#fefefe
| 589005 ||  || — || January 1, 2009 || Kitt Peak || Spacewatch ||  || align=right data-sort-value="0.59" | 590 m || 
|-id=006 bgcolor=#fefefe
| 589006 ||  || — || January 7, 2009 || Kitt Peak || Spacewatch ||  || align=right data-sort-value="0.66" | 660 m || 
|-id=007 bgcolor=#fefefe
| 589007 ||  || — || January 2, 2009 || Mount Lemmon || Mount Lemmon Survey ||  || align=right data-sort-value="0.52" | 520 m || 
|-id=008 bgcolor=#fefefe
| 589008 ||  || — || January 16, 2009 || Mount Lemmon || Mount Lemmon Survey || H || align=right data-sort-value="0.64" | 640 m || 
|-id=009 bgcolor=#fefefe
| 589009 ||  || — || January 16, 2009 || Kitt Peak || Spacewatch ||  || align=right data-sort-value="0.76" | 760 m || 
|-id=010 bgcolor=#E9E9E9
| 589010 ||  || — || January 16, 2009 || Kitt Peak || Spacewatch ||  || align=right | 2.2 km || 
|-id=011 bgcolor=#E9E9E9
| 589011 ||  || — || January 1, 2009 || Mount Lemmon || Mount Lemmon Survey ||  || align=right | 1.8 km || 
|-id=012 bgcolor=#E9E9E9
| 589012 ||  || — || January 16, 2009 || Kitt Peak || Spacewatch ||  || align=right | 2.3 km || 
|-id=013 bgcolor=#fefefe
| 589013 ||  || — || January 16, 2009 || Mount Lemmon || Mount Lemmon Survey || MAS || align=right data-sort-value="0.59" | 590 m || 
|-id=014 bgcolor=#E9E9E9
| 589014 ||  || — || November 24, 2008 || Mount Lemmon || Mount Lemmon Survey || DOR || align=right | 2.7 km || 
|-id=015 bgcolor=#E9E9E9
| 589015 ||  || — || November 21, 2008 || Mount Lemmon || Mount Lemmon Survey ||  || align=right | 2.2 km || 
|-id=016 bgcolor=#E9E9E9
| 589016 ||  || — || January 17, 2009 || Kitt Peak || Spacewatch ||  || align=right | 2.4 km || 
|-id=017 bgcolor=#d6d6d6
| 589017 ||  || — || March 12, 2005 || Kitt Peak || Spacewatch ||  || align=right | 3.3 km || 
|-id=018 bgcolor=#d6d6d6
| 589018 ||  || — || January 31, 2009 || Kitt Peak || Spacewatch ||  || align=right | 2.4 km || 
|-id=019 bgcolor=#fefefe
| 589019 ||  || — || January 3, 2009 || Mount Lemmon || Mount Lemmon Survey ||  || align=right data-sort-value="0.66" | 660 m || 
|-id=020 bgcolor=#fefefe
| 589020 ||  || — || January 15, 2009 || Kitt Peak || Spacewatch ||  || align=right data-sort-value="0.59" | 590 m || 
|-id=021 bgcolor=#d6d6d6
| 589021 ||  || — || November 15, 2007 || Mount Lemmon || Mount Lemmon Survey ||  || align=right | 2.3 km || 
|-id=022 bgcolor=#fefefe
| 589022 ||  || — || January 25, 2009 || Kitt Peak || Spacewatch || MAS || align=right data-sort-value="0.57" | 570 m || 
|-id=023 bgcolor=#fefefe
| 589023 ||  || — || January 29, 2009 || Kitt Peak || Spacewatch ||  || align=right data-sort-value="0.62" | 620 m || 
|-id=024 bgcolor=#E9E9E9
| 589024 ||  || — || September 12, 2007 || Mount Lemmon || Mount Lemmon Survey ||  || align=right | 1.9 km || 
|-id=025 bgcolor=#E9E9E9
| 589025 ||  || — || October 31, 2007 || Mount Lemmon || Mount Lemmon Survey ||  || align=right | 2.2 km || 
|-id=026 bgcolor=#fefefe
| 589026 ||  || — || January 29, 2009 || Kitt Peak || Spacewatch ||  || align=right data-sort-value="0.50" | 500 m || 
|-id=027 bgcolor=#d6d6d6
| 589027 ||  || — || January 29, 2009 || Kitt Peak || Spacewatch ||  || align=right | 1.6 km || 
|-id=028 bgcolor=#fefefe
| 589028 ||  || — || January 30, 2009 || Mount Lemmon || Mount Lemmon Survey ||  || align=right data-sort-value="0.51" | 510 m || 
|-id=029 bgcolor=#fefefe
| 589029 ||  || — || November 11, 2004 || Kitt Peak || Spacewatch ||  || align=right data-sort-value="0.78" | 780 m || 
|-id=030 bgcolor=#d6d6d6
| 589030 ||  || — || January 31, 2009 || Kitt Peak || Spacewatch ||  || align=right | 2.2 km || 
|-id=031 bgcolor=#E9E9E9
| 589031 ||  || — || October 12, 2007 || Mount Lemmon || Mount Lemmon Survey ||  || align=right | 2.0 km || 
|-id=032 bgcolor=#d6d6d6
| 589032 ||  || — || January 31, 2009 || Kitt Peak || Spacewatch ||  || align=right | 1.9 km || 
|-id=033 bgcolor=#E9E9E9
| 589033 ||  || — || October 8, 2007 || Mount Lemmon || Mount Lemmon Survey ||  || align=right | 2.4 km || 
|-id=034 bgcolor=#fefefe
| 589034 ||  || — || January 31, 2009 || Kitt Peak || Spacewatch ||  || align=right data-sort-value="0.55" | 550 m || 
|-id=035 bgcolor=#fefefe
| 589035 ||  || — || January 31, 2009 || Kitt Peak || Spacewatch ||  || align=right data-sort-value="0.53" | 530 m || 
|-id=036 bgcolor=#E9E9E9
| 589036 ||  || — || January 16, 2009 || Mount Lemmon || Mount Lemmon Survey ||  || align=right | 1.8 km || 
|-id=037 bgcolor=#fefefe
| 589037 ||  || — || January 25, 2009 || Kitt Peak || Spacewatch || MAS || align=right data-sort-value="0.56" | 560 m || 
|-id=038 bgcolor=#fefefe
| 589038 ||  || — || January 17, 2009 || Kitt Peak || Spacewatch ||  || align=right data-sort-value="0.60" | 600 m || 
|-id=039 bgcolor=#fefefe
| 589039 ||  || — || January 30, 2009 || Mount Lemmon || Mount Lemmon Survey ||  || align=right data-sort-value="0.62" | 620 m || 
|-id=040 bgcolor=#E9E9E9
| 589040 ||  || — || January 29, 2009 || Mount Lemmon || Mount Lemmon Survey ||  || align=right | 2.2 km || 
|-id=041 bgcolor=#E9E9E9
| 589041 ||  || — || November 7, 2012 || Mount Lemmon || Mount Lemmon Survey ||  || align=right | 2.3 km || 
|-id=042 bgcolor=#E9E9E9
| 589042 ||  || — || February 9, 2014 || Mount Lemmon || Mount Lemmon Survey ||  || align=right | 2.2 km || 
|-id=043 bgcolor=#E9E9E9
| 589043 ||  || — || November 11, 2012 || Nogales || M. Schwartz, P. R. Holvorcem ||  || align=right | 1.8 km || 
|-id=044 bgcolor=#d6d6d6
| 589044 ||  || — || January 31, 2009 || Mount Lemmon || Mount Lemmon Survey || 3:2 || align=right | 4.2 km || 
|-id=045 bgcolor=#fefefe
| 589045 ||  || — || January 25, 2009 || Kitt Peak || Spacewatch ||  || align=right data-sort-value="0.54" | 540 m || 
|-id=046 bgcolor=#fefefe
| 589046 ||  || — || August 28, 2014 || Haleakala || Pan-STARRS ||  || align=right data-sort-value="0.55" | 550 m || 
|-id=047 bgcolor=#fefefe
| 589047 ||  || — || January 18, 2009 || Mount Lemmon || Mount Lemmon Survey || H || align=right data-sort-value="0.52" | 520 m || 
|-id=048 bgcolor=#fefefe
| 589048 ||  || — || January 31, 2009 || Kitt Peak || Spacewatch ||  || align=right data-sort-value="0.60" | 600 m || 
|-id=049 bgcolor=#fefefe
| 589049 ||  || — || January 31, 2009 || Mount Lemmon || Mount Lemmon Survey ||  || align=right data-sort-value="0.56" | 560 m || 
|-id=050 bgcolor=#fefefe
| 589050 ||  || — || January 29, 2009 || Mount Lemmon || Mount Lemmon Survey ||  || align=right data-sort-value="0.60" | 600 m || 
|-id=051 bgcolor=#d6d6d6
| 589051 ||  || — || January 31, 2009 || Mount Lemmon || Mount Lemmon Survey ||  || align=right | 2.0 km || 
|-id=052 bgcolor=#d6d6d6
| 589052 ||  || — || January 20, 2009 || Kitt Peak || Spacewatch ||  || align=right | 1.8 km || 
|-id=053 bgcolor=#fefefe
| 589053 ||  || — || January 20, 2009 || Kitt Peak || Spacewatch ||  || align=right data-sort-value="0.48" | 480 m || 
|-id=054 bgcolor=#fefefe
| 589054 ||  || — || February 1, 2009 || Mount Lemmon || Mount Lemmon Survey ||  || align=right data-sort-value="0.67" | 670 m || 
|-id=055 bgcolor=#fefefe
| 589055 ||  || — || February 1, 2009 || Mount Lemmon || Mount Lemmon Survey ||  || align=right data-sort-value="0.70" | 700 m || 
|-id=056 bgcolor=#fefefe
| 589056 ||  || — || February 1, 2009 || Mount Lemmon || Mount Lemmon Survey ||  || align=right data-sort-value="0.66" | 660 m || 
|-id=057 bgcolor=#d6d6d6
| 589057 ||  || — || January 25, 2009 || Kitt Peak || Spacewatch ||  || align=right | 2.3 km || 
|-id=058 bgcolor=#fefefe
| 589058 ||  || — || August 10, 2007 || Kitt Peak || Spacewatch ||  || align=right data-sort-value="0.68" | 680 m || 
|-id=059 bgcolor=#E9E9E9
| 589059 ||  || — || December 22, 2008 || Mount Lemmon || Mount Lemmon Survey ||  || align=right | 1.9 km || 
|-id=060 bgcolor=#fefefe
| 589060 ||  || — || February 1, 2009 || Kitt Peak || Spacewatch ||  || align=right data-sort-value="0.54" | 540 m || 
|-id=061 bgcolor=#fefefe
| 589061 ||  || — || February 3, 2009 || Kitt Peak || Spacewatch ||  || align=right data-sort-value="0.69" | 690 m || 
|-id=062 bgcolor=#fefefe
| 589062 ||  || — || February 4, 2009 || Mount Lemmon || Mount Lemmon Survey ||  || align=right data-sort-value="0.49" | 490 m || 
|-id=063 bgcolor=#E9E9E9
| 589063 ||  || — || November 6, 2008 || Mount Lemmon || Mount Lemmon Survey ||  || align=right | 3.0 km || 
|-id=064 bgcolor=#fefefe
| 589064 ||  || — || February 13, 2009 || Kitt Peak || Spacewatch ||  || align=right data-sort-value="0.54" | 540 m || 
|-id=065 bgcolor=#d6d6d6
| 589065 ||  || — || January 15, 2009 || Kitt Peak || Spacewatch ||  || align=right | 2.8 km || 
|-id=066 bgcolor=#E9E9E9
| 589066 ||  || — || February 14, 2009 || Kitt Peak || Spacewatch ||  || align=right | 1.5 km || 
|-id=067 bgcolor=#fefefe
| 589067 ||  || — || February 3, 2009 || Kitt Peak || Spacewatch ||  || align=right data-sort-value="0.64" | 640 m || 
|-id=068 bgcolor=#fefefe
| 589068 ||  || — || February 14, 2009 || Kitt Peak || Spacewatch || H || align=right data-sort-value="0.75" | 750 m || 
|-id=069 bgcolor=#E9E9E9
| 589069 ||  || — || April 11, 2010 || Mount Lemmon || Mount Lemmon Survey ||  || align=right | 2.5 km || 
|-id=070 bgcolor=#E9E9E9
| 589070 ||  || — || November 4, 2007 || Kitt Peak || Spacewatch ||  || align=right | 2.0 km || 
|-id=071 bgcolor=#fefefe
| 589071 ||  || — || February 5, 2009 || Kitt Peak || Spacewatch ||  || align=right data-sort-value="0.62" | 620 m || 
|-id=072 bgcolor=#d6d6d6
| 589072 ||  || — || February 4, 2009 || Kitt Peak || Spacewatch ||  || align=right | 1.6 km || 
|-id=073 bgcolor=#fefefe
| 589073 ||  || — || February 14, 2009 || Kitt Peak || Spacewatch ||  || align=right data-sort-value="0.53" | 530 m || 
|-id=074 bgcolor=#E9E9E9
| 589074 ||  || — || April 21, 2006 || Kitt Peak || Spacewatch ||  || align=right | 2.1 km || 
|-id=075 bgcolor=#E9E9E9
| 589075 ||  || — || August 23, 2007 || Kitt Peak || Spacewatch ||  || align=right | 1.9 km || 
|-id=076 bgcolor=#fefefe
| 589076 ||  || — || February 20, 2009 || Calar Alto || F. Hormuth ||  || align=right data-sort-value="0.83" | 830 m || 
|-id=077 bgcolor=#fefefe
| 589077 ||  || — || February 16, 2009 || Kitt Peak || Spacewatch ||  || align=right data-sort-value="0.60" | 600 m || 
|-id=078 bgcolor=#fefefe
| 589078 ||  || — || February 16, 2009 || Kitt Peak || Spacewatch || (5026) || align=right data-sort-value="0.62" | 620 m || 
|-id=079 bgcolor=#fefefe
| 589079 ||  || — || February 4, 2009 || Mount Lemmon || Mount Lemmon Survey ||  || align=right data-sort-value="0.60" | 600 m || 
|-id=080 bgcolor=#E9E9E9
| 589080 ||  || — || September 10, 2007 || Kitt Peak || Spacewatch ||  || align=right | 2.0 km || 
|-id=081 bgcolor=#fefefe
| 589081 ||  || — || February 21, 2009 || Mount Lemmon || Mount Lemmon Survey ||  || align=right data-sort-value="0.88" | 880 m || 
|-id=082 bgcolor=#E9E9E9
| 589082 ||  || — || November 16, 2003 || Kitt Peak || Spacewatch ||  || align=right | 1.2 km || 
|-id=083 bgcolor=#d6d6d6
| 589083 ||  || — || January 1, 2009 || Mount Lemmon || Mount Lemmon Survey ||  || align=right | 1.9 km || 
|-id=084 bgcolor=#fefefe
| 589084 ||  || — || February 1, 2009 || Kitt Peak || Spacewatch ||  || align=right data-sort-value="0.52" | 520 m || 
|-id=085 bgcolor=#d6d6d6
| 589085 ||  || — || February 22, 2009 || Kitt Peak || Spacewatch ||  || align=right | 3.0 km || 
|-id=086 bgcolor=#E9E9E9
| 589086 ||  || — || October 9, 2007 || Mount Lemmon || Mount Lemmon Survey ||  || align=right | 1.9 km || 
|-id=087 bgcolor=#fefefe
| 589087 ||  || — || February 24, 2009 || Calar Alto || F. Hormuth ||  || align=right data-sort-value="0.53" | 530 m || 
|-id=088 bgcolor=#fefefe
| 589088 ||  || — || February 3, 2009 || Kitt Peak || Spacewatch ||  || align=right data-sort-value="0.62" | 620 m || 
|-id=089 bgcolor=#fefefe
| 589089 ||  || — || January 1, 2009 || Kitt Peak || Spacewatch ||  || align=right data-sort-value="0.49" | 490 m || 
|-id=090 bgcolor=#fefefe
| 589090 ||  || — || January 31, 2009 || Kitt Peak || Spacewatch ||  || align=right data-sort-value="0.68" | 680 m || 
|-id=091 bgcolor=#fefefe
| 589091 ||  || — || January 29, 2009 || Kitt Peak || Spacewatch ||  || align=right data-sort-value="0.65" | 650 m || 
|-id=092 bgcolor=#E9E9E9
| 589092 ||  || — || February 27, 2009 || Mount Lemmon || Mount Lemmon Survey ||  || align=right | 1.8 km || 
|-id=093 bgcolor=#fefefe
| 589093 ||  || — || February 28, 2009 || Mount Lemmon || Mount Lemmon Survey ||  || align=right data-sort-value="0.56" | 560 m || 
|-id=094 bgcolor=#d6d6d6
| 589094 ||  || — || February 28, 2009 || Mount Lemmon || Mount Lemmon Survey ||  || align=right | 1.8 km || 
|-id=095 bgcolor=#d6d6d6
| 589095 ||  || — || February 26, 2009 || Kitt Peak || Spacewatch ||  || align=right | 1.8 km || 
|-id=096 bgcolor=#fefefe
| 589096 ||  || — || February 26, 2009 || Kitt Peak || Spacewatch ||  || align=right data-sort-value="0.55" | 550 m || 
|-id=097 bgcolor=#fefefe
| 589097 ||  || — || February 1, 2009 || Kitt Peak || Spacewatch ||  || align=right data-sort-value="0.57" | 570 m || 
|-id=098 bgcolor=#fefefe
| 589098 ||  || — || February 19, 2009 || Kitt Peak || Spacewatch ||  || align=right data-sort-value="0.71" | 710 m || 
|-id=099 bgcolor=#fefefe
| 589099 ||  || — || February 28, 2009 || Kitt Peak || Spacewatch ||  || align=right data-sort-value="0.53" | 530 m || 
|-id=100 bgcolor=#fefefe
| 589100 ||  || — || February 20, 2009 || Kitt Peak || Spacewatch ||  || align=right data-sort-value="0.77" | 770 m || 
|}

589101–589200 

|-bgcolor=#fefefe
| 589101 ||  || — || February 21, 2009 || Catalina || CSS ||  || align=right data-sort-value="0.80" | 800 m || 
|-id=102 bgcolor=#fefefe
| 589102 ||  || — || February 27, 2009 || Catalina || CSS ||  || align=right data-sort-value="0.74" | 740 m || 
|-id=103 bgcolor=#d6d6d6
| 589103 ||  || — || February 26, 2009 || Calar Alto || F. Hormuth ||  || align=right | 2.3 km || 
|-id=104 bgcolor=#fefefe
| 589104 ||  || — || January 28, 2009 || Kitt Peak || Spacewatch ||  || align=right data-sort-value="0.64" | 640 m || 
|-id=105 bgcolor=#fefefe
| 589105 ||  || — || December 23, 2012 || Haleakala || Pan-STARRS ||  || align=right data-sort-value="0.73" | 730 m || 
|-id=106 bgcolor=#fefefe
| 589106 ||  || — || November 3, 2011 || Kitt Peak || Spacewatch ||  || align=right data-sort-value="0.66" | 660 m || 
|-id=107 bgcolor=#fefefe
| 589107 ||  || — || February 20, 2009 || Kitt Peak || Spacewatch ||  || align=right data-sort-value="0.54" | 540 m || 
|-id=108 bgcolor=#fefefe
| 589108 ||  || — || February 28, 2009 || Kitt Peak || Spacewatch ||  || align=right data-sort-value="0.52" | 520 m || 
|-id=109 bgcolor=#fefefe
| 589109 ||  || — || February 21, 2009 || Kitt Peak || Spacewatch ||  || align=right data-sort-value="0.60" | 600 m || 
|-id=110 bgcolor=#d6d6d6
| 589110 ||  || — || February 28, 2009 || Kitt Peak || Spacewatch ||  || align=right | 1.8 km || 
|-id=111 bgcolor=#E9E9E9
| 589111 ||  || — || February 22, 2009 || Mount Lemmon || Mount Lemmon Survey ||  || align=right | 1.8 km || 
|-id=112 bgcolor=#E9E9E9
| 589112 ||  || — || November 5, 2007 || Kitt Peak || Spacewatch ||  || align=right | 1.6 km || 
|-id=113 bgcolor=#fefefe
| 589113 ||  || — || December 22, 2008 || Mount Lemmon || Mount Lemmon Survey ||  || align=right data-sort-value="0.76" | 760 m || 
|-id=114 bgcolor=#fefefe
| 589114 ||  || — || March 2, 2009 || Kitt Peak || Spacewatch ||  || align=right data-sort-value="0.72" | 720 m || 
|-id=115 bgcolor=#E9E9E9
| 589115 ||  || — || February 1, 2009 || Catalina || CSS ||  || align=right | 2.1 km || 
|-id=116 bgcolor=#d6d6d6
| 589116 ||  || — || March 15, 2009 || Mount Lemmon || Mount Lemmon Survey ||  || align=right | 2.0 km || 
|-id=117 bgcolor=#d6d6d6
| 589117 ||  || — || December 4, 2007 || Kitt Peak || Spacewatch ||  || align=right | 2.5 km || 
|-id=118 bgcolor=#fefefe
| 589118 ||  || — || March 15, 2009 || Kitt Peak || Spacewatch ||  || align=right data-sort-value="0.68" | 680 m || 
|-id=119 bgcolor=#d6d6d6
| 589119 ||  || — || March 3, 2009 || Mount Lemmon || Mount Lemmon Survey ||  || align=right | 1.8 km || 
|-id=120 bgcolor=#fefefe
| 589120 ||  || — || March 2, 2009 || Mount Lemmon || Mount Lemmon Survey ||  || align=right data-sort-value="0.90" | 900 m || 
|-id=121 bgcolor=#fefefe
| 589121 ||  || — || March 2, 2009 || Kitt Peak || Spacewatch ||  || align=right data-sort-value="0.59" | 590 m || 
|-id=122 bgcolor=#d6d6d6
| 589122 ||  || — || September 20, 2011 || Mount Lemmon || Mount Lemmon Survey ||  || align=right | 1.8 km || 
|-id=123 bgcolor=#d6d6d6
| 589123 ||  || — || March 2, 2009 || Kitt Peak || Spacewatch ||  || align=right | 2.0 km || 
|-id=124 bgcolor=#fefefe
| 589124 ||  || — || March 8, 2009 || Mount Lemmon || Mount Lemmon Survey || H || align=right data-sort-value="0.54" | 540 m || 
|-id=125 bgcolor=#d6d6d6
| 589125 ||  || — || March 3, 2009 || Mount Lemmon || Mount Lemmon Survey ||  || align=right | 1.9 km || 
|-id=126 bgcolor=#d6d6d6
| 589126 ||  || — || March 18, 2009 || Mount Lemmon || Mount Lemmon Survey ||  || align=right | 1.6 km || 
|-id=127 bgcolor=#d6d6d6
| 589127 ||  || — || February 14, 2009 || Mount Lemmon || Mount Lemmon Survey ||  || align=right | 2.7 km || 
|-id=128 bgcolor=#fefefe
| 589128 ||  || — || March 1, 2009 || Mount Lemmon || Mount Lemmon Survey ||  || align=right data-sort-value="0.66" | 660 m || 
|-id=129 bgcolor=#fefefe
| 589129 ||  || — || February 19, 2009 || Kitt Peak || Spacewatch ||  || align=right data-sort-value="0.56" | 560 m || 
|-id=130 bgcolor=#fefefe
| 589130 ||  || — || March 28, 2009 || Kitt Peak || Spacewatch ||  || align=right data-sort-value="0.73" | 730 m || 
|-id=131 bgcolor=#d6d6d6
| 589131 ||  || — || March 28, 2009 || Mount Lemmon || Mount Lemmon Survey ||  || align=right | 2.3 km || 
|-id=132 bgcolor=#d6d6d6
| 589132 ||  || — || March 26, 2009 || Mount Lemmon || Mount Lemmon Survey ||  || align=right | 2.0 km || 
|-id=133 bgcolor=#fefefe
| 589133 ||  || — || March 28, 2009 || Kitt Peak || Spacewatch ||  || align=right data-sort-value="0.66" | 660 m || 
|-id=134 bgcolor=#E9E9E9
| 589134 ||  || — || March 24, 2009 || Mount Lemmon || Mount Lemmon Survey ||  || align=right | 2.1 km || 
|-id=135 bgcolor=#d6d6d6
| 589135 ||  || — || February 28, 2014 || Haleakala || Pan-STARRS ||  || align=right | 2.3 km || 
|-id=136 bgcolor=#d6d6d6
| 589136 ||  || — || November 12, 2012 || Mount Lemmon || Mount Lemmon Survey ||  || align=right | 2.0 km || 
|-id=137 bgcolor=#fefefe
| 589137 ||  || — || February 19, 2009 || Kitt Peak || Spacewatch ||  || align=right data-sort-value="0.46" | 460 m || 
|-id=138 bgcolor=#fefefe
| 589138 ||  || — || February 24, 2009 || Kitt Peak || Spacewatch ||  || align=right data-sort-value="0.49" | 490 m || 
|-id=139 bgcolor=#d6d6d6
| 589139 ||  || — || September 18, 2011 || Mount Lemmon || Mount Lemmon Survey ||  || align=right | 1.7 km || 
|-id=140 bgcolor=#fefefe
| 589140 ||  || — || February 19, 2009 || Mount Lemmon || Mount Lemmon Survey ||  || align=right data-sort-value="0.56" | 560 m || 
|-id=141 bgcolor=#fefefe
| 589141 ||  || — || March 22, 2009 || Mount Lemmon || Mount Lemmon Survey ||  || align=right data-sort-value="0.60" | 600 m || 
|-id=142 bgcolor=#fefefe
| 589142 ||  || — || September 30, 2003 || Kitt Peak || Spacewatch ||  || align=right | 1.0 km || 
|-id=143 bgcolor=#fefefe
| 589143 ||  || — || March 16, 2009 || Mount Lemmon || Mount Lemmon Survey ||  || align=right data-sort-value="0.59" | 590 m || 
|-id=144 bgcolor=#d6d6d6
| 589144 ||  || — || March 22, 2009 || Mount Lemmon || Mount Lemmon Survey ||  || align=right | 1.9 km || 
|-id=145 bgcolor=#d6d6d6
| 589145 ||  || — || March 19, 2009 || Kitt Peak || Spacewatch ||  || align=right | 2.1 km || 
|-id=146 bgcolor=#fefefe
| 589146 ||  || — || September 13, 2007 || Kitt Peak || Spacewatch || H || align=right data-sort-value="0.59" | 590 m || 
|-id=147 bgcolor=#fefefe
| 589147 ||  || — || February 1, 2016 || Haleakala || Pan-STARRS ||  || align=right data-sort-value="0.62" | 620 m || 
|-id=148 bgcolor=#fefefe
| 589148 ||  || — || March 26, 2009 || Kitt Peak || Spacewatch ||  || align=right data-sort-value="0.74" | 740 m || 
|-id=149 bgcolor=#d6d6d6
| 589149 ||  || — || April 17, 2009 || Kitt Peak || Spacewatch ||  || align=right | 1.8 km || 
|-id=150 bgcolor=#fefefe
| 589150 ||  || — || August 24, 2003 || Cerro Tololo || Cerro Tololo Obs. ||  || align=right data-sort-value="0.60" | 600 m || 
|-id=151 bgcolor=#fefefe
| 589151 ||  || — || April 19, 2009 || Mount Lemmon || Mount Lemmon Survey ||  || align=right data-sort-value="0.58" | 580 m || 
|-id=152 bgcolor=#d6d6d6
| 589152 ||  || — || August 9, 2005 || Cerro Tololo || Cerro Tololo Obs. ||  || align=right | 1.8 km || 
|-id=153 bgcolor=#d6d6d6
| 589153 ||  || — || March 29, 2004 || Kitt Peak || Spacewatch ||  || align=right | 2.0 km || 
|-id=154 bgcolor=#d6d6d6
| 589154 ||  || — || April 2, 2009 || Mount Lemmon || Mount Lemmon Survey ||  || align=right | 2.0 km || 
|-id=155 bgcolor=#fefefe
| 589155 ||  || — || March 7, 2009 || Mount Lemmon || Mount Lemmon Survey ||  || align=right data-sort-value="0.63" | 630 m || 
|-id=156 bgcolor=#fefefe
| 589156 ||  || — || April 19, 2009 || Kitt Peak || Spacewatch ||  || align=right data-sort-value="0.64" | 640 m || 
|-id=157 bgcolor=#fefefe
| 589157 ||  || — || March 28, 2009 || Kitt Peak || Spacewatch ||  || align=right data-sort-value="0.58" | 580 m || 
|-id=158 bgcolor=#d6d6d6
| 589158 ||  || — || April 18, 2009 || Kitt Peak || Spacewatch ||  || align=right | 2.5 km || 
|-id=159 bgcolor=#fefefe
| 589159 ||  || — || March 1, 2005 || Kitt Peak || Spacewatch ||  || align=right data-sort-value="0.92" | 920 m || 
|-id=160 bgcolor=#d6d6d6
| 589160 ||  || — || April 2, 2009 || Mount Lemmon || Mount Lemmon Survey ||  || align=right | 2.6 km || 
|-id=161 bgcolor=#E9E9E9
| 589161 ||  || — || April 20, 2009 || Kitt Peak || Spacewatch ||  || align=right | 1.8 km || 
|-id=162 bgcolor=#d6d6d6
| 589162 ||  || — || October 28, 2006 || Mount Lemmon || Mount Lemmon Survey ||  || align=right | 2.6 km || 
|-id=163 bgcolor=#fefefe
| 589163 ||  || — || April 20, 2009 || Mount Lemmon || Mount Lemmon Survey ||  || align=right data-sort-value="0.78" | 780 m || 
|-id=164 bgcolor=#fefefe
| 589164 ||  || — || March 4, 2005 || Kitt Peak || Spacewatch ||  || align=right data-sort-value="0.87" | 870 m || 
|-id=165 bgcolor=#fefefe
| 589165 ||  || — || April 26, 2009 || Mount Lemmon || Mount Lemmon Survey ||  || align=right data-sort-value="0.74" | 740 m || 
|-id=166 bgcolor=#fefefe
| 589166 ||  || — || March 18, 2009 || Kitt Peak || Spacewatch ||  || align=right data-sort-value="0.73" | 730 m || 
|-id=167 bgcolor=#d6d6d6
| 589167 ||  || — || April 30, 2009 || Cerro Burek || Alianza S4 Obs. ||  || align=right | 2.4 km || 
|-id=168 bgcolor=#fefefe
| 589168 ||  || — || April 27, 2009 || Mount Lemmon || Mount Lemmon Survey || MAS || align=right data-sort-value="0.63" | 630 m || 
|-id=169 bgcolor=#d6d6d6
| 589169 ||  || — || April 20, 2009 || Mount Lemmon || Mount Lemmon Survey ||  || align=right | 2.3 km || 
|-id=170 bgcolor=#E9E9E9
| 589170 ||  || — || April 28, 2009 || Mount Lemmon || Mount Lemmon Survey ||  || align=right | 1.1 km || 
|-id=171 bgcolor=#fefefe
| 589171 ||  || — || April 29, 2009 || Mount Lemmon || Mount Lemmon Survey ||  || align=right data-sort-value="0.73" | 730 m || 
|-id=172 bgcolor=#fefefe
| 589172 ||  || — || April 30, 2009 || Kitt Peak || Spacewatch ||  || align=right data-sort-value="0.64" | 640 m || 
|-id=173 bgcolor=#fefefe
| 589173 ||  || — || April 20, 2009 || Mount Lemmon || Mount Lemmon Survey ||  || align=right data-sort-value="0.68" | 680 m || 
|-id=174 bgcolor=#d6d6d6
| 589174 ||  || — || April 22, 2009 || Mount Lemmon || Mount Lemmon Survey ||  || align=right | 1.8 km || 
|-id=175 bgcolor=#E9E9E9
| 589175 ||  || — || April 7, 2013 || Oukaimeden || M. Ory ||  || align=right data-sort-value="0.86" | 860 m || 
|-id=176 bgcolor=#fefefe
| 589176 ||  || — || April 22, 2009 || Mount Lemmon || Mount Lemmon Survey ||  || align=right data-sort-value="0.58" | 580 m || 
|-id=177 bgcolor=#d6d6d6
| 589177 ||  || — || January 8, 2013 || Oukaimeden || M. Ory ||  || align=right | 2.0 km || 
|-id=178 bgcolor=#fefefe
| 589178 ||  || — || April 17, 2009 || Kitt Peak || Spacewatch ||  || align=right data-sort-value="0.68" | 680 m || 
|-id=179 bgcolor=#d6d6d6
| 589179 ||  || — || April 29, 2009 || Mount Lemmon || Mount Lemmon Survey ||  || align=right | 1.9 km || 
|-id=180 bgcolor=#d6d6d6
| 589180 ||  || — || April 19, 2009 || Mount Lemmon || Mount Lemmon Survey ||  || align=right | 2.1 km || 
|-id=181 bgcolor=#d6d6d6
| 589181 ||  || — || April 23, 2009 || Kitt Peak || Spacewatch ||  || align=right | 2.3 km || 
|-id=182 bgcolor=#d6d6d6
| 589182 ||  || — || April 27, 2009 || Kitt Peak || Spacewatch ||  || align=right | 2.0 km || 
|-id=183 bgcolor=#fefefe
| 589183 ||  || — || May 15, 2009 || Kitt Peak || Spacewatch ||  || align=right data-sort-value="0.88" | 880 m || 
|-id=184 bgcolor=#d6d6d6
| 589184 ||  || — || May 15, 2009 || Kitt Peak || Spacewatch ||  || align=right | 2.3 km || 
|-id=185 bgcolor=#d6d6d6
| 589185 ||  || — || April 20, 2009 || Kitt Peak || Spacewatch ||  || align=right | 2.5 km || 
|-id=186 bgcolor=#d6d6d6
| 589186 ||  || — || March 24, 2009 || Mount Lemmon || Mount Lemmon Survey ||  || align=right | 2.8 km || 
|-id=187 bgcolor=#d6d6d6
| 589187 ||  || — || February 7, 2008 || Kitt Peak || Spacewatch ||  || align=right | 2.9 km || 
|-id=188 bgcolor=#fefefe
| 589188 ||  || — || March 11, 2005 || Mount Lemmon || Mount Lemmon Survey ||  || align=right data-sort-value="0.64" | 640 m || 
|-id=189 bgcolor=#d6d6d6
| 589189 ||  || — || April 27, 2009 || Mount Lemmon || Mount Lemmon Survey ||  || align=right | 2.1 km || 
|-id=190 bgcolor=#d6d6d6
| 589190 ||  || — || May 29, 2009 || Mount Lemmon || Mount Lemmon Survey ||  || align=right | 2.0 km || 
|-id=191 bgcolor=#d6d6d6
| 589191 ||  || — || May 4, 2009 || Mount Lemmon || Mount Lemmon Survey ||  || align=right | 2.4 km || 
|-id=192 bgcolor=#d6d6d6
| 589192 ||  || — || April 6, 2014 || Mount Lemmon || Mount Lemmon Survey ||  || align=right | 2.6 km || 
|-id=193 bgcolor=#d6d6d6
| 589193 ||  || — || November 16, 1995 || Kitt Peak || Spacewatch ||  || align=right | 2.4 km || 
|-id=194 bgcolor=#fefefe
| 589194 ||  || — || May 25, 2009 || Kitt Peak || Spacewatch ||  || align=right data-sort-value="0.66" | 660 m || 
|-id=195 bgcolor=#fefefe
| 589195 ||  || — || January 13, 2016 || Haleakala || Pan-STARRS ||  || align=right data-sort-value="0.73" | 730 m || 
|-id=196 bgcolor=#d6d6d6
| 589196 ||  || — || April 19, 2009 || Kitt Peak || Spacewatch ||  || align=right | 2.6 km || 
|-id=197 bgcolor=#d6d6d6
| 589197 ||  || — || May 2, 2009 || Mount Lemmon || Mount Lemmon Survey ||  || align=right | 2.9 km || 
|-id=198 bgcolor=#d6d6d6
| 589198 ||  || — || June 12, 2009 || Kitt Peak || Spacewatch ||  || align=right | 3.2 km || 
|-id=199 bgcolor=#fefefe
| 589199 ||  || — || July 14, 2013 || Haleakala || Pan-STARRS ||  || align=right data-sort-value="0.64" | 640 m || 
|-id=200 bgcolor=#fefefe
| 589200 ||  || — || June 16, 2009 || XuYi || PMO NEO ||  || align=right | 1.3 km || 
|}

589201–589300 

|-bgcolor=#fefefe
| 589201 ||  || — || April 14, 2005 || Catalina || CSS ||  || align=right data-sort-value="0.91" | 910 m || 
|-id=202 bgcolor=#d6d6d6
| 589202 ||  || — || June 21, 2009 || Mount Lemmon || Mount Lemmon Survey ||  || align=right | 3.6 km || 
|-id=203 bgcolor=#fefefe
| 589203 ||  || — || June 21, 2009 || Mount Lemmon || Mount Lemmon Survey ||  || align=right data-sort-value="0.66" | 660 m || 
|-id=204 bgcolor=#E9E9E9
| 589204 ||  || — || September 21, 2009 || Catalina || CSS ||  || align=right | 1.1 km || 
|-id=205 bgcolor=#d6d6d6
| 589205 ||  || — || June 22, 2009 || Kitt Peak || Spacewatch ||  || align=right | 1.8 km || 
|-id=206 bgcolor=#E9E9E9
| 589206 ||  || — || June 17, 2009 || Mount Lemmon || Mount Lemmon Survey ||  || align=right | 1.1 km || 
|-id=207 bgcolor=#d6d6d6
| 589207 ||  || — || November 2, 2010 || Mount Lemmon || Mount Lemmon Survey ||  || align=right | 2.5 km || 
|-id=208 bgcolor=#d6d6d6
| 589208 ||  || — || February 18, 2013 || Nogales || M. Schwartz, P. R. Holvorcem ||  || align=right | 3.6 km || 
|-id=209 bgcolor=#fefefe
| 589209 ||  || — || July 13, 2009 || Kitt Peak || Spacewatch ||  || align=right data-sort-value="0.66" | 660 m || 
|-id=210 bgcolor=#d6d6d6
| 589210 ||  || — || July 27, 2009 || Catalina || CSS ||  || align=right | 3.4 km || 
|-id=211 bgcolor=#d6d6d6
| 589211 ||  || — || January 27, 2007 || Kitt Peak || Spacewatch ||  || align=right | 3.1 km || 
|-id=212 bgcolor=#d6d6d6
| 589212 ||  || — || July 28, 2009 || Kitt Peak || Spacewatch ||  || align=right | 2.5 km || 
|-id=213 bgcolor=#d6d6d6
| 589213 ||  || — || December 30, 2005 || Kitt Peak || Spacewatch ||  || align=right | 2.3 km || 
|-id=214 bgcolor=#fefefe
| 589214 ||  || — || July 28, 2009 || Kitt Peak || Spacewatch ||  || align=right data-sort-value="0.62" | 620 m || 
|-id=215 bgcolor=#d6d6d6
| 589215 ||  || — || July 27, 2009 || Catalina || CSS ||  || align=right | 3.0 km || 
|-id=216 bgcolor=#d6d6d6
| 589216 ||  || — || July 27, 2009 || Kitt Peak || Spacewatch ||  || align=right | 2.8 km || 
|-id=217 bgcolor=#fefefe
| 589217 ||  || — || April 3, 2008 || Kitt Peak || Spacewatch ||  || align=right | 1.0 km || 
|-id=218 bgcolor=#d6d6d6
| 589218 ||  || — || August 14, 2009 || Dauban || C. Rinner, F. Kugel ||  || align=right | 2.5 km || 
|-id=219 bgcolor=#d6d6d6
| 589219 ||  || — || August 15, 2009 || Catalina || CSS ||  || align=right | 2.7 km || 
|-id=220 bgcolor=#d6d6d6
| 589220 ||  || — || January 19, 2012 || Haleakala || Pan-STARRS ||  || align=right | 3.0 km || 
|-id=221 bgcolor=#d6d6d6
| 589221 ||  || — || February 16, 2012 || Haleakala || Pan-STARRS ||  || align=right | 2.2 km || 
|-id=222 bgcolor=#d6d6d6
| 589222 ||  || — || February 17, 2007 || Kitt Peak || Spacewatch ||  || align=right | 3.6 km || 
|-id=223 bgcolor=#d6d6d6
| 589223 ||  || — || August 16, 2009 || Kitt Peak || Spacewatch ||  || align=right | 2.9 km || 
|-id=224 bgcolor=#d6d6d6
| 589224 ||  || — || August 16, 2009 || Goodricke-Pigott || R. A. Tucker ||  || align=right | 4.2 km || 
|-id=225 bgcolor=#d6d6d6
| 589225 ||  || — || April 21, 2009 || Kitt Peak || Spacewatch ||  || align=right | 2.3 km || 
|-id=226 bgcolor=#d6d6d6
| 589226 ||  || — || August 17, 2009 || Crni Vrh || S. Matičič ||  || align=right | 2.6 km || 
|-id=227 bgcolor=#d6d6d6
| 589227 ||  || — || November 7, 2005 || Mauna Kea || Mauna Kea Obs. ||  || align=right | 2.9 km || 
|-id=228 bgcolor=#d6d6d6
| 589228 ||  || — || July 14, 2009 || Kitt Peak || Spacewatch ||  || align=right | 3.2 km || 
|-id=229 bgcolor=#d6d6d6
| 589229 ||  || — || August 22, 2009 || Dauban || C. Rinner, F. Kugel ||  || align=right | 3.2 km || 
|-id=230 bgcolor=#fefefe
| 589230 ||  || — || August 19, 2009 || Kitt Peak || Spacewatch ||  || align=right data-sort-value="0.87" | 870 m || 
|-id=231 bgcolor=#E9E9E9
| 589231 ||  || — || August 18, 2009 || La Sagra || OAM Obs. ||  || align=right data-sort-value="0.94" | 940 m || 
|-id=232 bgcolor=#d6d6d6
| 589232 ||  || — || February 26, 2012 || Mount Lemmon || Mount Lemmon Survey ||  || align=right | 3.7 km || 
|-id=233 bgcolor=#E9E9E9
| 589233 ||  || — || April 29, 2012 || Mount Lemmon || Mount Lemmon Survey ||  || align=right data-sort-value="0.94" | 940 m || 
|-id=234 bgcolor=#fefefe
| 589234 ||  || — || September 6, 2013 || La Sagra || OAM Obs. ||  || align=right data-sort-value="0.72" | 720 m || 
|-id=235 bgcolor=#d6d6d6
| 589235 ||  || — || August 27, 2009 || Kitt Peak || Spacewatch ||  || align=right | 2.3 km || 
|-id=236 bgcolor=#d6d6d6
| 589236 ||  || — || August 29, 2009 || Kitt Peak || Spacewatch ||  || align=right | 2.6 km || 
|-id=237 bgcolor=#fefefe
| 589237 ||  || — || August 27, 2009 || Kitt Peak || Spacewatch ||  || align=right data-sort-value="0.64" | 640 m || 
|-id=238 bgcolor=#fefefe
| 589238 ||  || — || August 17, 2009 || Kitt Peak || Spacewatch ||  || align=right data-sort-value="0.74" | 740 m || 
|-id=239 bgcolor=#d6d6d6
| 589239 ||  || — || August 27, 2009 || Kitt Peak || Spacewatch ||  || align=right | 2.6 km || 
|-id=240 bgcolor=#fefefe
| 589240 ||  || — || August 18, 2009 || Kitt Peak || Spacewatch ||  || align=right data-sort-value="0.84" | 840 m || 
|-id=241 bgcolor=#fefefe
| 589241 ||  || — || December 15, 2006 || Mount Lemmon || Mount Lemmon Survey ||  || align=right | 1.0 km || 
|-id=242 bgcolor=#d6d6d6
| 589242 ||  || — || March 16, 2007 || Kitt Peak || Spacewatch ||  || align=right | 2.8 km || 
|-id=243 bgcolor=#E9E9E9
| 589243 ||  || — || October 1, 2005 || Kitt Peak || Spacewatch ||  || align=right | 1.5 km || 
|-id=244 bgcolor=#C2FFFF
| 589244 ||  || — || September 14, 2009 || Kitt Peak || Spacewatch || L4006 || align=right | 12 km || 
|-id=245 bgcolor=#fefefe
| 589245 ||  || — || September 15, 2009 || Kitt Peak || Spacewatch ||  || align=right | 1.1 km || 
|-id=246 bgcolor=#C2FFFF
| 589246 ||  || — || September 15, 2009 || Kitt Peak || Spacewatch || L4 || align=right | 9.2 km || 
|-id=247 bgcolor=#d6d6d6
| 589247 ||  || — || January 23, 2006 || Kitt Peak || Spacewatch ||  || align=right | 2.9 km || 
|-id=248 bgcolor=#d6d6d6
| 589248 ||  || — || September 15, 2009 || Mount Lemmon || Mount Lemmon Survey ||  || align=right | 2.9 km || 
|-id=249 bgcolor=#d6d6d6
| 589249 ||  || — || February 16, 2012 || Haleakala || Pan-STARRS ||  || align=right | 2.7 km || 
|-id=250 bgcolor=#C2FFFF
| 589250 ||  || — || February 10, 2016 || Haleakala || Pan-STARRS || L4 || align=right | 6.8 km || 
|-id=251 bgcolor=#d6d6d6
| 589251 ||  || — || September 15, 2009 || Mount Lemmon || Mount Lemmon Survey ||  || align=right | 3.0 km || 
|-id=252 bgcolor=#C2FFFF
| 589252 ||  || — || September 15, 2009 || Kitt Peak || Spacewatch || L4 || align=right | 6.3 km || 
|-id=253 bgcolor=#E9E9E9
| 589253 ||  || — || September 17, 2009 || Zelenchukskaya Stn || T. V. Kryachko, B. Satovski ||  || align=right | 1.5 km || 
|-id=254 bgcolor=#d6d6d6
| 589254 ||  || — || September 16, 2009 || Mount Lemmon || Mount Lemmon Survey ||  || align=right | 2.2 km || 
|-id=255 bgcolor=#E9E9E9
| 589255 ||  || — || September 17, 2009 || Zelenchukskaya Stn || T. V. Kryachko, B. Satovski ||  || align=right | 1.2 km || 
|-id=256 bgcolor=#C2FFFF
| 589256 ||  || — || September 16, 2009 || Kitt Peak || Spacewatch || L4 || align=right | 7.4 km || 
|-id=257 bgcolor=#C2FFFF
| 589257 ||  || — || September 16, 2009 || Kitt Peak || Spacewatch || L4 || align=right | 8.0 km || 
|-id=258 bgcolor=#C2FFFF
| 589258 ||  || — || September 16, 2009 || Kitt Peak || Spacewatch || L4 || align=right | 6.0 km || 
|-id=259 bgcolor=#d6d6d6
| 589259 ||  || — || September 16, 2009 || Kitt Peak || Spacewatch || 7:4 || align=right | 2.4 km || 
|-id=260 bgcolor=#E9E9E9
| 589260 ||  || — || September 16, 2009 || Kitt Peak || Spacewatch ||  || align=right data-sort-value="0.78" | 780 m || 
|-id=261 bgcolor=#FA8072
| 589261 ||  || — || September 17, 2009 || Kitt Peak || Spacewatch || H || align=right data-sort-value="0.39" | 390 m || 
|-id=262 bgcolor=#E9E9E9
| 589262 ||  || — || September 18, 2009 || Kitt Peak || Spacewatch ||  || align=right data-sort-value="0.87" | 870 m || 
|-id=263 bgcolor=#d6d6d6
| 589263 ||  || — || September 16, 2009 || Mount Lemmon || Mount Lemmon Survey ||  || align=right | 2.8 km || 
|-id=264 bgcolor=#d6d6d6
| 589264 ||  || — || September 16, 2009 || Kitt Peak || Spacewatch ||  || align=right | 2.8 km || 
|-id=265 bgcolor=#fefefe
| 589265 ||  || — || September 17, 2009 || Mount Lemmon || Mount Lemmon Survey ||  || align=right data-sort-value="0.59" | 590 m || 
|-id=266 bgcolor=#fefefe
| 589266 ||  || — || September 18, 2009 || Kitt Peak || Spacewatch ||  || align=right data-sort-value="0.60" | 600 m || 
|-id=267 bgcolor=#E9E9E9
| 589267 ||  || — || March 10, 2008 || Kitt Peak || Spacewatch ||  || align=right | 1.1 km || 
|-id=268 bgcolor=#fefefe
| 589268 ||  || — || February 23, 2003 || Kitt Peak || Spacewatch ||  || align=right data-sort-value="0.71" | 710 m || 
|-id=269 bgcolor=#d6d6d6
| 589269 ||  || — || September 19, 2009 || Kitt Peak || Spacewatch ||  || align=right | 3.3 km || 
|-id=270 bgcolor=#E9E9E9
| 589270 ||  || — || September 19, 2009 || Mount Lemmon || Mount Lemmon Survey ||  || align=right data-sort-value="0.85" | 850 m || 
|-id=271 bgcolor=#E9E9E9
| 589271 ||  || — || August 16, 2009 || Kitt Peak || Spacewatch ||  || align=right | 1.6 km || 
|-id=272 bgcolor=#C2FFFF
| 589272 ||  || — || September 12, 2009 || Kitt Peak || Spacewatch || L4 || align=right | 8.0 km || 
|-id=273 bgcolor=#d6d6d6
| 589273 ||  || — || September 20, 2009 || Kitt Peak || Spacewatch ||  || align=right | 2.1 km || 
|-id=274 bgcolor=#C2FFFF
| 589274 ||  || — || September 20, 2009 || Kitt Peak || Spacewatch || L4 || align=right | 6.8 km || 
|-id=275 bgcolor=#d6d6d6
| 589275 ||  || — || September 18, 2009 || Mount Lemmon || Mount Lemmon Survey ||  || align=right | 2.4 km || 
|-id=276 bgcolor=#C2FFFF
| 589276 ||  || — || September 21, 2009 || Kitt Peak || Spacewatch || L4 || align=right | 6.8 km || 
|-id=277 bgcolor=#C2FFFF
| 589277 ||  || — || September 22, 2009 || Kitt Peak || Spacewatch || L4 || align=right | 6.6 km || 
|-id=278 bgcolor=#C2FFFF
| 589278 ||  || — || September 18, 2009 || Kitt Peak || Spacewatch || L4 || align=right | 6.8 km || 
|-id=279 bgcolor=#C2FFFF
| 589279 ||  || — || September 22, 2009 || Kitt Peak || Spacewatch || L4 || align=right | 6.5 km || 
|-id=280 bgcolor=#E9E9E9
| 589280 ||  || — || September 2, 2005 || Palomar || NEAT ||  || align=right | 1.0 km || 
|-id=281 bgcolor=#d6d6d6
| 589281 ||  || — || August 18, 2009 || Kitt Peak || Spacewatch ||  || align=right | 2.1 km || 
|-id=282 bgcolor=#d6d6d6
| 589282 ||  || — || September 26, 2009 || Mount Lemmon || Mount Lemmon Survey ||  || align=right | 2.0 km || 
|-id=283 bgcolor=#d6d6d6
| 589283 ||  || — || October 10, 2004 || Kitt Peak || L. H. Wasserman, J. R. Lovering ||  || align=right | 2.5 km || 
|-id=284 bgcolor=#C2FFFF
| 589284 ||  || — || September 17, 2009 || Kitt Peak || Spacewatch || L4 || align=right | 6.1 km || 
|-id=285 bgcolor=#d6d6d6
| 589285 ||  || — || May 1, 2006 || Kitt Peak || Spacewatch ||  || align=right | 3.5 km || 
|-id=286 bgcolor=#d6d6d6
| 589286 ||  || — || November 3, 2004 || Kitt Peak || Spacewatch ||  || align=right | 3.1 km || 
|-id=287 bgcolor=#C2FFFF
| 589287 ||  || — || September 25, 2009 || Kitt Peak || Spacewatch || L4 || align=right | 8.2 km || 
|-id=288 bgcolor=#d6d6d6
| 589288 ||  || — || January 8, 2006 || Mount Lemmon || Mount Lemmon Survey ||  || align=right | 2.5 km || 
|-id=289 bgcolor=#C2FFFF
| 589289 ||  || — || September 27, 2009 || Mount Lemmon || Mount Lemmon Survey || L4 || align=right | 8.8 km || 
|-id=290 bgcolor=#fefefe
| 589290 ||  || — || September 28, 2009 || Sandlot || G. Hug ||  || align=right data-sort-value="0.56" | 560 m || 
|-id=291 bgcolor=#C2FFFF
| 589291 ||  || — || September 16, 2009 || Kitt Peak || Spacewatch || L4 || align=right | 7.4 km || 
|-id=292 bgcolor=#C2FFFF
| 589292 ||  || — || September 7, 2008 || Mount Lemmon || Mount Lemmon Survey || L4 || align=right | 7.4 km || 
|-id=293 bgcolor=#d6d6d6
| 589293 ||  || — || September 18, 2009 || Kitt Peak || Spacewatch ||  || align=right | 2.9 km || 
|-id=294 bgcolor=#d6d6d6
| 589294 ||  || — || August 15, 2009 || Kitt Peak || Spacewatch ||  || align=right | 2.7 km || 
|-id=295 bgcolor=#C2FFFF
| 589295 ||  || — || September 20, 2009 || Kitt Peak || Spacewatch || L4 || align=right | 6.7 km || 
|-id=296 bgcolor=#d6d6d6
| 589296 ||  || — || September 25, 2009 || Kitt Peak || Spacewatch ||  || align=right | 2.3 km || 
|-id=297 bgcolor=#fefefe
| 589297 ||  || — || February 12, 2003 || Haleakala || AMOS ||  || align=right | 1.4 km || 
|-id=298 bgcolor=#d6d6d6
| 589298 ||  || — || April 15, 2007 || Mount Lemmon || Mount Lemmon Survey ||  || align=right | 3.1 km || 
|-id=299 bgcolor=#C2FFFF
| 589299 ||  || — || October 10, 1997 || Kitt Peak || Spacewatch || L4 || align=right | 8.5 km || 
|-id=300 bgcolor=#fefefe
| 589300 ||  || — || September 24, 2009 || Mount Lemmon || Mount Lemmon Survey ||  || align=right data-sort-value="0.65" | 650 m || 
|}

589301–589400 

|-bgcolor=#E9E9E9
| 589301 ||  || — || September 27, 2009 || Kitt Peak || Spacewatch ||  || align=right | 1.1 km || 
|-id=302 bgcolor=#C2FFFF
| 589302 ||  || — || September 29, 2009 || Mount Lemmon || Mount Lemmon Survey || L4 || align=right | 9.9 km || 
|-id=303 bgcolor=#d6d6d6
| 589303 ||  || — || September 16, 2009 || Mount Lemmon || Mount Lemmon Survey ||  || align=right | 3.5 km || 
|-id=304 bgcolor=#E9E9E9
| 589304 ||  || — || April 3, 2011 || Haleakala || Pan-STARRS ||  || align=right data-sort-value="0.69" | 690 m || 
|-id=305 bgcolor=#fefefe
| 589305 ||  || — || September 17, 2009 || Kitt Peak || Spacewatch ||  || align=right data-sort-value="0.69" | 690 m || 
|-id=306 bgcolor=#C2FFFF
| 589306 ||  || — || September 20, 2009 || Kitt Peak || Spacewatch || L4 || align=right | 6.4 km || 
|-id=307 bgcolor=#E9E9E9
| 589307 ||  || — || September 4, 2013 || Calar Alto || F. Hormuth ||  || align=right data-sort-value="0.65" | 650 m || 
|-id=308 bgcolor=#C2FFFF
| 589308 ||  || — || November 2, 2010 || Mount Lemmon || Mount Lemmon Survey || L4 || align=right | 8.2 km || 
|-id=309 bgcolor=#E9E9E9
| 589309 ||  || — || September 10, 2013 || Haleakala || Pan-STARRS ||  || align=right data-sort-value="0.87" | 870 m || 
|-id=310 bgcolor=#d6d6d6
| 589310 ||  || — || February 27, 2012 || Haleakala || Pan-STARRS ||  || align=right | 2.2 km || 
|-id=311 bgcolor=#C2FFFF
| 589311 ||  || — || August 20, 2009 || Kitt Peak || Spacewatch || L4 || align=right | 6.5 km || 
|-id=312 bgcolor=#C2FFFF
| 589312 ||  || — || January 17, 2013 || Kitt Peak || Spacewatch || L4 || align=right | 8.3 km || 
|-id=313 bgcolor=#d6d6d6
| 589313 ||  || — || March 16, 2012 || Mount Lemmon || Mount Lemmon Survey || 7:4 || align=right | 2.4 km || 
|-id=314 bgcolor=#d6d6d6
| 589314 ||  || — || September 29, 2009 || Mount Lemmon || Mount Lemmon Survey ||  || align=right | 2.1 km || 
|-id=315 bgcolor=#C2FFFF
| 589315 ||  || — || September 29, 2009 || Mount Lemmon || Mount Lemmon Survey || L4 || align=right | 7.5 km || 
|-id=316 bgcolor=#C2FFFF
| 589316 ||  || — || September 29, 2009 || Mount Lemmon || Mount Lemmon Survey || L4 || align=right | 7.4 km || 
|-id=317 bgcolor=#C2FFFF
| 589317 ||  || — || November 26, 2010 || Mount Lemmon || Mount Lemmon Survey || L4 || align=right | 6.1 km || 
|-id=318 bgcolor=#C2FFFF
| 589318 ||  || — || October 13, 2010 || Mount Lemmon || Mount Lemmon Survey || L4 || align=right | 6.5 km || 
|-id=319 bgcolor=#C2FFFF
| 589319 ||  || — || September 20, 2009 || Kitt Peak || Spacewatch || L4 || align=right | 5.6 km || 
|-id=320 bgcolor=#C2FFFF
| 589320 ||  || — || October 17, 2010 || Mount Lemmon || Mount Lemmon Survey || L4 || align=right | 6.4 km || 
|-id=321 bgcolor=#C2FFFF
| 589321 ||  || — || September 26, 2009 || Kitt Peak || Spacewatch || L4 || align=right | 6.1 km || 
|-id=322 bgcolor=#C2FFFF
| 589322 ||  || — || September 17, 2009 || Kitt Peak || Spacewatch || L4 || align=right | 7.2 km || 
|-id=323 bgcolor=#d6d6d6
| 589323 ||  || — || September 27, 2009 || Kitt Peak || Spacewatch ||  || align=right | 1.8 km || 
|-id=324 bgcolor=#C2FFFF
| 589324 ||  || — || September 21, 2009 || Mount Lemmon || Mount Lemmon Survey || L4 || align=right | 7.1 km || 
|-id=325 bgcolor=#d6d6d6
| 589325 ||  || — || September 16, 2009 || Mount Lemmon || Mount Lemmon Survey ||  || align=right | 2.6 km || 
|-id=326 bgcolor=#C2FFFF
| 589326 ||  || — || September 18, 2009 || Kitt Peak || Spacewatch || L4 || align=right | 7.5 km || 
|-id=327 bgcolor=#C2FFFF
| 589327 ||  || — || September 21, 2009 || Mount Lemmon || Mount Lemmon Survey || L4 || align=right | 6.6 km || 
|-id=328 bgcolor=#C2FFFF
| 589328 ||  || — || September 21, 2009 || Mount Lemmon || Mount Lemmon Survey || L4 || align=right | 6.5 km || 
|-id=329 bgcolor=#C2FFFF
| 589329 ||  || — || September 26, 2009 || Kitt Peak || Spacewatch || L4 || align=right | 6.2 km || 
|-id=330 bgcolor=#C2FFFF
| 589330 ||  || — || September 21, 2009 || Kitt Peak || Spacewatch || L4 || align=right | 5.9 km || 
|-id=331 bgcolor=#C2FFFF
| 589331 ||  || — || September 21, 2009 || Mount Lemmon || Mount Lemmon Survey || L4 || align=right | 6.8 km || 
|-id=332 bgcolor=#E9E9E9
| 589332 ||  || — || September 17, 2009 || Kitt Peak || Spacewatch ||  || align=right data-sort-value="0.69" | 690 m || 
|-id=333 bgcolor=#C2FFFF
| 589333 ||  || — || September 16, 2009 || Kitt Peak || Spacewatch || L4 || align=right | 5.8 km || 
|-id=334 bgcolor=#C2FFFF
| 589334 ||  || — || September 29, 2009 || Kitt Peak || Spacewatch || L4 || align=right | 6.3 km || 
|-id=335 bgcolor=#C2FFFF
| 589335 ||  || — || September 26, 2009 || Kitt Peak || Spacewatch || L4 || align=right | 6.9 km || 
|-id=336 bgcolor=#C2FFFF
| 589336 ||  || — || September 17, 2009 || Mount Lemmon || Mount Lemmon Survey || L4 || align=right | 6.7 km || 
|-id=337 bgcolor=#E9E9E9
| 589337 ||  || — || October 11, 2009 || Mount Lemmon || Mount Lemmon Survey ||  || align=right data-sort-value="0.86" | 860 m || 
|-id=338 bgcolor=#E9E9E9
| 589338 ||  || — || October 2, 2009 || Mount Lemmon || Mount Lemmon Survey ||  || align=right | 1.2 km || 
|-id=339 bgcolor=#E9E9E9
| 589339 ||  || — || September 21, 2017 || Haleakala || Pan-STARRS ||  || align=right data-sort-value="0.92" | 920 m || 
|-id=340 bgcolor=#C2FFFF
| 589340 ||  || — || November 13, 2010 || Kitt Peak || Spacewatch || L4 || align=right | 8.8 km || 
|-id=341 bgcolor=#E9E9E9
| 589341 ||  || — || June 15, 2016 || Mount Lemmon || Mount Lemmon Survey ||  || align=right | 1.2 km || 
|-id=342 bgcolor=#C2FFFF
| 589342 ||  || — || October 14, 2009 || Mount Lemmon || Mount Lemmon Survey || L4 || align=right | 6.9 km || 
|-id=343 bgcolor=#d6d6d6
| 589343 ||  || — || September 17, 2009 || Mount Lemmon || Mount Lemmon Survey ||  || align=right | 2.3 km || 
|-id=344 bgcolor=#E9E9E9
| 589344 ||  || — || October 25, 2009 || Modra || Š. Gajdoš, J. Világi || (194) || align=right data-sort-value="0.96" | 960 m || 
|-id=345 bgcolor=#fefefe
| 589345 ||  || — || September 13, 2005 || Kitt Peak || Spacewatch ||  || align=right data-sort-value="0.65" | 650 m || 
|-id=346 bgcolor=#E9E9E9
| 589346 ||  || — || October 27, 2005 || Mount Lemmon || Mount Lemmon Survey ||  || align=right data-sort-value="0.91" | 910 m || 
|-id=347 bgcolor=#d6d6d6
| 589347 ||  || — || October 22, 2009 || Mount Lemmon || Mount Lemmon Survey ||  || align=right | 1.6 km || 
|-id=348 bgcolor=#d6d6d6
| 589348 ||  || — || August 15, 2009 || Kitt Peak || Spacewatch ||  || align=right | 2.9 km || 
|-id=349 bgcolor=#fefefe
| 589349 ||  || — || October 17, 2009 || Mount Lemmon || Mount Lemmon Survey ||  || align=right data-sort-value="0.63" | 630 m || 
|-id=350 bgcolor=#E9E9E9
| 589350 ||  || — || October 17, 2009 || Mount Lemmon || Mount Lemmon Survey ||  || align=right data-sort-value="0.75" | 750 m || 
|-id=351 bgcolor=#E9E9E9
| 589351 ||  || — || October 17, 2009 || Mount Lemmon || Mount Lemmon Survey ||  || align=right data-sort-value="0.66" | 660 m || 
|-id=352 bgcolor=#E9E9E9
| 589352 ||  || — || October 21, 2009 || Mount Lemmon || Mount Lemmon Survey ||  || align=right | 1.4 km || 
|-id=353 bgcolor=#C2FFFF
| 589353 ||  || — || October 22, 2009 || Mount Lemmon || Mount Lemmon Survey || L4 || align=right | 6.1 km || 
|-id=354 bgcolor=#E9E9E9
| 589354 ||  || — || October 22, 2009 || Mount Lemmon || Mount Lemmon Survey ||  || align=right data-sort-value="0.76" | 760 m || 
|-id=355 bgcolor=#fefefe
| 589355 ||  || — || October 22, 2009 || Mount Lemmon || Mount Lemmon Survey ||  || align=right data-sort-value="0.53" | 530 m || 
|-id=356 bgcolor=#E9E9E9
| 589356 ||  || — || October 23, 2009 || Kitt Peak || Spacewatch ||  || align=right data-sort-value="0.89" | 890 m || 
|-id=357 bgcolor=#E9E9E9
| 589357 ||  || — || January 21, 2002 || Kitt Peak || Spacewatch ||  || align=right data-sort-value="0.67" | 670 m || 
|-id=358 bgcolor=#C2FFFF
| 589358 ||  || — || October 22, 2009 || Mount Lemmon || Mount Lemmon Survey || L4 || align=right | 7.1 km || 
|-id=359 bgcolor=#fefefe
| 589359 ||  || — || October 22, 2009 || Mount Lemmon || Mount Lemmon Survey ||  || align=right data-sort-value="0.86" | 860 m || 
|-id=360 bgcolor=#E9E9E9
| 589360 ||  || — || October 20, 2009 || Zelenchukskaya Stn || T. V. Kryachko, B. Satovski ||  || align=right | 2.7 km || 
|-id=361 bgcolor=#E9E9E9
| 589361 ||  || — || September 19, 2009 || Mount Lemmon || Mount Lemmon Survey ||  || align=right | 1.2 km || 
|-id=362 bgcolor=#E9E9E9
| 589362 ||  || — || October 18, 2009 || Mount Lemmon || Mount Lemmon Survey ||  || align=right data-sort-value="0.77" | 770 m || 
|-id=363 bgcolor=#E9E9E9
| 589363 ||  || — || October 22, 2009 || Catalina || CSS ||  || align=right data-sort-value="0.80" | 800 m || 
|-id=364 bgcolor=#E9E9E9
| 589364 ||  || — || March 15, 2012 || Mount Lemmon || Mount Lemmon Survey ||  || align=right data-sort-value="0.87" | 870 m || 
|-id=365 bgcolor=#E9E9E9
| 589365 ||  || — || October 18, 2009 || Mount Lemmon || Mount Lemmon Survey ||  || align=right data-sort-value="0.73" | 730 m || 
|-id=366 bgcolor=#C2FFFF
| 589366 ||  || — || October 16, 2009 || Mount Lemmon || Mount Lemmon Survey || L4 || align=right | 7.2 km || 
|-id=367 bgcolor=#C2FFFF
| 589367 ||  || — || November 2, 2010 || Mount Lemmon || Mount Lemmon Survey || L4 || align=right | 7.0 km || 
|-id=368 bgcolor=#d6d6d6
| 589368 ||  || — || December 2, 2010 || Mount Lemmon || Mount Lemmon Survey ||  || align=right | 2.8 km || 
|-id=369 bgcolor=#C2FFFF
| 589369 ||  || — || October 27, 2009 || Mount Lemmon || Mount Lemmon Survey || L4 || align=right | 7.7 km || 
|-id=370 bgcolor=#C2FFFF
| 589370 ||  || — || October 16, 2009 || Mount Lemmon || Mount Lemmon Survey || L4 || align=right | 6.4 km || 
|-id=371 bgcolor=#C2FFFF
| 589371 ||  || — || October 24, 2009 || Kitt Peak || Spacewatch || L4 || align=right | 5.7 km || 
|-id=372 bgcolor=#C2FFFF
| 589372 ||  || — || October 21, 2009 || Mount Lemmon || Mount Lemmon Survey || L4 || align=right | 6.6 km || 
|-id=373 bgcolor=#E9E9E9
| 589373 ||  || — || October 22, 2009 || Mount Lemmon || Mount Lemmon Survey ||  || align=right | 1.3 km || 
|-id=374 bgcolor=#C2FFFF
| 589374 ||  || — || October 22, 2009 || Mount Lemmon || Mount Lemmon Survey || L4 || align=right | 9.4 km || 
|-id=375 bgcolor=#C2FFFF
| 589375 ||  || — || October 25, 2009 || Kitt Peak || Spacewatch || L4 || align=right | 6.3 km || 
|-id=376 bgcolor=#d6d6d6
| 589376 ||  || — || October 23, 2009 || Mount Lemmon || Mount Lemmon Survey || 7:4 || align=right | 3.7 km || 
|-id=377 bgcolor=#E9E9E9
| 589377 ||  || — || October 25, 2005 || Mount Lemmon || Mount Lemmon Survey ||  || align=right data-sort-value="0.71" | 710 m || 
|-id=378 bgcolor=#d6d6d6
| 589378 ||  || — || September 26, 2009 || Kitt Peak || Spacewatch ||  || align=right | 2.8 km || 
|-id=379 bgcolor=#d6d6d6
| 589379 ||  || — || October 27, 2009 || Kitt Peak || Spacewatch || 7:4 || align=right | 3.0 km || 
|-id=380 bgcolor=#E9E9E9
| 589380 ||  || — || October 24, 2009 || Kitt Peak || Spacewatch ||  || align=right | 1.3 km || 
|-id=381 bgcolor=#E9E9E9
| 589381 ||  || — || October 25, 2005 || Mount Lemmon || Mount Lemmon Survey ||  || align=right data-sort-value="0.58" | 580 m || 
|-id=382 bgcolor=#d6d6d6
| 589382 ||  || — || November 8, 2009 || Mount Lemmon || Mount Lemmon Survey ||  || align=right | 1.8 km || 
|-id=383 bgcolor=#E9E9E9
| 589383 ||  || — || November 9, 2009 || Mount Lemmon || Mount Lemmon Survey ||  || align=right data-sort-value="0.96" | 960 m || 
|-id=384 bgcolor=#E9E9E9
| 589384 ||  || — || November 10, 2005 || Kitt Peak || Spacewatch ||  || align=right data-sort-value="0.89" | 890 m || 
|-id=385 bgcolor=#E9E9E9
| 589385 ||  || — || November 10, 2009 || Kitt Peak || Spacewatch ||  || align=right data-sort-value="0.87" | 870 m || 
|-id=386 bgcolor=#d6d6d6
| 589386 ||  || — || March 26, 2006 || Mount Lemmon || Mount Lemmon Survey || 7:4 || align=right | 3.5 km || 
|-id=387 bgcolor=#E9E9E9
| 589387 ||  || — || November 10, 2009 || Kitt Peak || Spacewatch ||  || align=right data-sort-value="0.71" | 710 m || 
|-id=388 bgcolor=#E9E9E9
| 589388 ||  || — || November 10, 2009 || Kitt Peak || Spacewatch ||  || align=right data-sort-value="0.57" | 570 m || 
|-id=389 bgcolor=#E9E9E9
| 589389 ||  || — || April 27, 2012 || Haleakala || Pan-STARRS ||  || align=right data-sort-value="0.69" | 690 m || 
|-id=390 bgcolor=#fefefe
| 589390 ||  || — || August 3, 2016 || Haleakala || Pan-STARRS ||  || align=right data-sort-value="0.76" | 760 m || 
|-id=391 bgcolor=#d6d6d6
| 589391 ||  || — || November 9, 2009 || Mount Lemmon || Mount Lemmon Survey || 7:4 || align=right | 3.1 km || 
|-id=392 bgcolor=#E9E9E9
| 589392 ||  || — || October 3, 2013 || Kitt Peak || Spacewatch ||  || align=right data-sort-value="0.76" | 760 m || 
|-id=393 bgcolor=#d6d6d6
| 589393 ||  || — || November 8, 2009 || Mount Lemmon || Mount Lemmon Survey ||  || align=right | 2.4 km || 
|-id=394 bgcolor=#E9E9E9
| 589394 ||  || — || November 9, 2009 || Kitt Peak || Spacewatch ||  || align=right | 1.2 km || 
|-id=395 bgcolor=#E9E9E9
| 589395 ||  || — || October 12, 2004 || Kitt Peak || L. H. Wasserman, J. R. Lovering ||  || align=right data-sort-value="0.83" | 830 m || 
|-id=396 bgcolor=#E9E9E9
| 589396 ||  || — || November 19, 2009 || Tzec Maun || V. Nevski ||  || align=right | 1.4 km || 
|-id=397 bgcolor=#E9E9E9
| 589397 ||  || — || April 26, 2008 || Mount Lemmon || Mount Lemmon Survey ||  || align=right data-sort-value="0.94" | 940 m || 
|-id=398 bgcolor=#fefefe
| 589398 ||  || — || November 8, 2009 || Kitt Peak || Spacewatch ||  || align=right data-sort-value="0.44" | 440 m || 
|-id=399 bgcolor=#E9E9E9
| 589399 ||  || — || December 8, 2005 || Mount Lemmon || Mount Lemmon Survey ||  || align=right data-sort-value="0.89" | 890 m || 
|-id=400 bgcolor=#E9E9E9
| 589400 ||  || — || July 1, 2008 || Kitt Peak || Spacewatch ||  || align=right | 1.0 km || 
|}

589401–589500 

|-bgcolor=#E9E9E9
| 589401 ||  || — || October 30, 2005 || Kitt Peak || Spacewatch ||  || align=right data-sort-value="0.68" | 680 m || 
|-id=402 bgcolor=#C2FFFF
| 589402 ||  || — || September 15, 2009 || Kitt Peak || Spacewatch || L4 || align=right | 8.9 km || 
|-id=403 bgcolor=#E9E9E9
| 589403 ||  || — || November 26, 2005 || Kitt Peak || Spacewatch ||  || align=right data-sort-value="0.80" | 800 m || 
|-id=404 bgcolor=#E9E9E9
| 589404 ||  || — || October 24, 2009 || Kitt Peak || Spacewatch ||  || align=right | 1.1 km || 
|-id=405 bgcolor=#E9E9E9
| 589405 ||  || — || October 23, 2009 || Kitt Peak || Spacewatch ||  || align=right data-sort-value="0.69" | 690 m || 
|-id=406 bgcolor=#E9E9E9
| 589406 ||  || — || November 16, 2009 || Mount Lemmon || Mount Lemmon Survey ||  || align=right data-sort-value="0.70" | 700 m || 
|-id=407 bgcolor=#E9E9E9
| 589407 ||  || — || October 25, 2005 || Mount Lemmon || Mount Lemmon Survey ||  || align=right data-sort-value="0.61" | 610 m || 
|-id=408 bgcolor=#E9E9E9
| 589408 ||  || — || November 18, 2009 || Kitt Peak || Spacewatch ||  || align=right | 1.2 km || 
|-id=409 bgcolor=#d6d6d6
| 589409 ||  || — || November 18, 2009 || Kitt Peak || Spacewatch || 7:4 || align=right | 3.1 km || 
|-id=410 bgcolor=#E9E9E9
| 589410 ||  || — || October 24, 2009 || Kitt Peak || Spacewatch ||  || align=right data-sort-value="0.87" | 870 m || 
|-id=411 bgcolor=#E9E9E9
| 589411 ||  || — || November 21, 2009 || Catalina || CSS ||  || align=right | 1.0 km || 
|-id=412 bgcolor=#E9E9E9
| 589412 ||  || — || November 20, 2009 || Kitt Peak || Spacewatch ||  || align=right data-sort-value="0.79" | 790 m || 
|-id=413 bgcolor=#E9E9E9
| 589413 ||  || — || October 25, 2009 || Kitt Peak || Spacewatch ||  || align=right | 1.4 km || 
|-id=414 bgcolor=#E9E9E9
| 589414 ||  || — || November 20, 2009 || Kitt Peak || Spacewatch ||  || align=right | 1.7 km || 
|-id=415 bgcolor=#E9E9E9
| 589415 ||  || — || April 9, 2003 || Kitt Peak || Spacewatch ||  || align=right data-sort-value="0.88" | 880 m || 
|-id=416 bgcolor=#E9E9E9
| 589416 ||  || — || October 28, 2005 || Kitt Peak || Spacewatch ||  || align=right data-sort-value="0.79" | 790 m || 
|-id=417 bgcolor=#d6d6d6
| 589417 ||  || — || October 14, 2009 || Mount Lemmon || Mount Lemmon Survey ||  || align=right | 3.4 km || 
|-id=418 bgcolor=#fefefe
| 589418 ||  || — || August 21, 2001 || Kitt Peak || Spacewatch ||  || align=right data-sort-value="0.59" | 590 m || 
|-id=419 bgcolor=#C2FFFF
| 589419 ||  || — || September 8, 1996 || Kitt Peak || Spacewatch || L4(8060) || align=right | 6.3 km || 
|-id=420 bgcolor=#C2FFFF
| 589420 ||  || — || October 6, 2008 || Mount Lemmon || Mount Lemmon Survey || L4 || align=right | 7.4 km || 
|-id=421 bgcolor=#C2FFFF
| 589421 ||  || — || October 14, 2009 || Mount Lemmon || Mount Lemmon Survey || L4 || align=right | 8.7 km || 
|-id=422 bgcolor=#E9E9E9
| 589422 ||  || — || November 19, 2009 || Mount Lemmon || Mount Lemmon Survey ||  || align=right | 1.2 km || 
|-id=423 bgcolor=#E9E9E9
| 589423 ||  || — || March 23, 2003 || Palomar || NEAT || MAR || align=right | 1.3 km || 
|-id=424 bgcolor=#E9E9E9
| 589424 ||  || — || November 23, 2009 || Kitt Peak || Spacewatch ||  || align=right data-sort-value="0.82" | 820 m || 
|-id=425 bgcolor=#E9E9E9
| 589425 ||  || — || November 9, 2009 || Kitt Peak || Spacewatch ||  || align=right | 1.2 km || 
|-id=426 bgcolor=#E9E9E9
| 589426 ||  || — || November 9, 2009 || Mount Lemmon || Mount Lemmon Survey ||  || align=right | 1.2 km || 
|-id=427 bgcolor=#E9E9E9
| 589427 ||  || — || October 24, 2009 || Kitt Peak || Spacewatch ||  || align=right data-sort-value="0.85" | 850 m || 
|-id=428 bgcolor=#E9E9E9
| 589428 ||  || — || November 24, 2009 || Kitt Peak || Spacewatch ||  || align=right data-sort-value="0.91" | 910 m || 
|-id=429 bgcolor=#E9E9E9
| 589429 ||  || — || November 26, 2009 || Mount Lemmon || Mount Lemmon Survey ||  || align=right | 1.5 km || 
|-id=430 bgcolor=#E9E9E9
| 589430 ||  || — || December 1, 2005 || Mount Lemmon || Mount Lemmon Survey ||  || align=right | 1.2 km || 
|-id=431 bgcolor=#fefefe
| 589431 ||  || — || November 16, 2009 || Mount Lemmon || Mount Lemmon Survey ||  || align=right data-sort-value="0.56" | 560 m || 
|-id=432 bgcolor=#E9E9E9
| 589432 ||  || — || November 16, 2009 || Mount Lemmon || Mount Lemmon Survey ||  || align=right data-sort-value="0.85" | 850 m || 
|-id=433 bgcolor=#E9E9E9
| 589433 ||  || — || November 17, 2009 || Mount Lemmon || Mount Lemmon Survey ||  || align=right | 1.0 km || 
|-id=434 bgcolor=#C2FFFF
| 589434 ||  || — || October 12, 2009 || Mount Lemmon || Mount Lemmon Survey || L4 || align=right | 8.0 km || 
|-id=435 bgcolor=#E9E9E9
| 589435 ||  || — || October 14, 2009 || Mount Lemmon || Mount Lemmon Survey ||  || align=right data-sort-value="0.76" | 760 m || 
|-id=436 bgcolor=#E9E9E9
| 589436 ||  || — || December 7, 2005 || Kitt Peak || Spacewatch ||  || align=right | 1.2 km || 
|-id=437 bgcolor=#E9E9E9
| 589437 ||  || — || November 18, 2009 || Kitt Peak || Spacewatch ||  || align=right data-sort-value="0.95" | 950 m || 
|-id=438 bgcolor=#fefefe
| 589438 ||  || — || November 17, 2009 || Kitt Peak || Spacewatch ||  || align=right data-sort-value="0.69" | 690 m || 
|-id=439 bgcolor=#E9E9E9
| 589439 ||  || — || January 23, 2006 || Kitt Peak || Spacewatch ||  || align=right | 1.9 km || 
|-id=440 bgcolor=#E9E9E9
| 589440 ||  || — || November 19, 2009 || Kitt Peak || Spacewatch ||  || align=right | 1.4 km || 
|-id=441 bgcolor=#E9E9E9
| 589441 ||  || — || February 21, 2007 || Kitt Peak || Spacewatch ||  || align=right | 1.2 km || 
|-id=442 bgcolor=#E9E9E9
| 589442 ||  || — || November 16, 2009 || Kitt Peak || Spacewatch ||  || align=right | 1.6 km || 
|-id=443 bgcolor=#E9E9E9
| 589443 ||  || — || November 16, 2009 || Kitt Peak || Spacewatch ||  || align=right | 1.2 km || 
|-id=444 bgcolor=#E9E9E9
| 589444 ||  || — || November 19, 2009 || Kitt Peak || Spacewatch ||  || align=right | 1.1 km || 
|-id=445 bgcolor=#E9E9E9
| 589445 ||  || — || November 23, 2009 || Mount Lemmon || Mount Lemmon Survey ||  || align=right | 1.0 km || 
|-id=446 bgcolor=#E9E9E9
| 589446 ||  || — || November 24, 2009 || Kitt Peak || Spacewatch ||  || align=right data-sort-value="0.79" | 790 m || 
|-id=447 bgcolor=#E9E9E9
| 589447 ||  || — || April 1, 2016 || Haleakala || Pan-STARRS ||  || align=right data-sort-value="0.95" | 950 m || 
|-id=448 bgcolor=#fefefe
| 589448 ||  || — || November 3, 2012 || Mount Lemmon || Mount Lemmon Survey ||  || align=right data-sort-value="0.34" | 340 m || 
|-id=449 bgcolor=#E9E9E9
| 589449 ||  || — || November 17, 2009 || Mount Lemmon || Mount Lemmon Survey ||  || align=right data-sort-value="0.66" | 660 m || 
|-id=450 bgcolor=#E9E9E9
| 589450 ||  || — || November 24, 2009 || Kitt Peak || Spacewatch ||  || align=right | 1.2 km || 
|-id=451 bgcolor=#E9E9E9
| 589451 ||  || — || November 17, 2009 || Mount Lemmon || Mount Lemmon Survey ||  || align=right data-sort-value="0.69" | 690 m || 
|-id=452 bgcolor=#E9E9E9
| 589452 ||  || — || November 19, 2009 || Kitt Peak || Spacewatch ||  || align=right | 1.4 km || 
|-id=453 bgcolor=#E9E9E9
| 589453 ||  || — || October 5, 2013 || Haleakala || Pan-STARRS ||  || align=right data-sort-value="0.67" | 670 m || 
|-id=454 bgcolor=#E9E9E9
| 589454 ||  || — || November 4, 2013 || Mount Lemmon || Mount Lemmon Survey ||  || align=right data-sort-value="0.68" | 680 m || 
|-id=455 bgcolor=#E9E9E9
| 589455 ||  || — || March 17, 2016 || Haleakala || Pan-STARRS ||  || align=right data-sort-value="0.80" | 800 m || 
|-id=456 bgcolor=#E9E9E9
| 589456 ||  || — || October 24, 2013 || Mount Lemmon || Mount Lemmon Survey ||  || align=right | 1.2 km || 
|-id=457 bgcolor=#E9E9E9
| 589457 ||  || — || October 24, 2013 || Mount Lemmon || Mount Lemmon Survey ||  || align=right data-sort-value="0.74" | 740 m || 
|-id=458 bgcolor=#E9E9E9
| 589458 ||  || — || November 26, 2009 || Mount Lemmon || Mount Lemmon Survey ||  || align=right data-sort-value="0.64" | 640 m || 
|-id=459 bgcolor=#E9E9E9
| 589459 ||  || — || April 1, 2011 || Kitt Peak || Spacewatch ||  || align=right | 1.0 km || 
|-id=460 bgcolor=#E9E9E9
| 589460 ||  || — || November 21, 2009 || Kitt Peak || Spacewatch ||  || align=right | 1.3 km || 
|-id=461 bgcolor=#fefefe
| 589461 ||  || — || November 25, 2009 || Kitt Peak || Spacewatch ||  || align=right data-sort-value="0.49" | 490 m || 
|-id=462 bgcolor=#E9E9E9
| 589462 ||  || — || August 7, 2008 || Kitt Peak || Spacewatch ||  || align=right | 1.2 km || 
|-id=463 bgcolor=#E9E9E9
| 589463 ||  || — || January 23, 2006 || Kitt Peak || Spacewatch ||  || align=right | 2.3 km || 
|-id=464 bgcolor=#fefefe
| 589464 ||  || — || December 11, 2009 || Mount Lemmon || Mount Lemmon Survey ||  || align=right data-sort-value="0.56" | 560 m || 
|-id=465 bgcolor=#E9E9E9
| 589465 ||  || — || December 9, 2013 || XuYi || PMO NEO ||  || align=right data-sort-value="0.87" | 870 m || 
|-id=466 bgcolor=#fefefe
| 589466 ||  || — || September 23, 2005 || Kitt Peak || Spacewatch ||  || align=right data-sort-value="0.49" | 490 m || 
|-id=467 bgcolor=#d6d6d6
| 589467 ||  || — || November 8, 2009 || Mount Lemmon || Mount Lemmon Survey ||  || align=right | 3.3 km || 
|-id=468 bgcolor=#E9E9E9
| 589468 ||  || — || August 21, 2004 || Siding Spring || SSS ||  || align=right | 1.1 km || 
|-id=469 bgcolor=#E9E9E9
| 589469 ||  || — || December 17, 2009 || Mount Lemmon || Mount Lemmon Survey ||  || align=right | 1.2 km || 
|-id=470 bgcolor=#E9E9E9
| 589470 ||  || — || December 18, 2009 || Mount Lemmon || Mount Lemmon Survey ||  || align=right | 1.0 km || 
|-id=471 bgcolor=#E9E9E9
| 589471 ||  || — || March 22, 2015 || Mount Lemmon || Mount Lemmon Survey ||  || align=right data-sort-value="0.91" | 910 m || 
|-id=472 bgcolor=#E9E9E9
| 589472 ||  || — || October 13, 2013 || Kitt Peak || Spacewatch ||  || align=right | 1.1 km || 
|-id=473 bgcolor=#E9E9E9
| 589473 ||  || — || December 17, 2009 || Kitt Peak || Spacewatch ||  || align=right | 1.6 km || 
|-id=474 bgcolor=#E9E9E9
| 589474 ||  || — || January 6, 2010 || Kitt Peak || Spacewatch ||  || align=right | 1.6 km || 
|-id=475 bgcolor=#E9E9E9
| 589475 ||  || — || November 7, 2005 || Mauna Kea || Mauna Kea Obs. ||  || align=right | 1.1 km || 
|-id=476 bgcolor=#E9E9E9
| 589476 ||  || — || September 25, 2008 || Mount Lemmon || Mount Lemmon Survey ||  || align=right | 1.1 km || 
|-id=477 bgcolor=#fefefe
| 589477 ||  || — || April 25, 2004 || Kitt Peak || Spacewatch ||  || align=right data-sort-value="0.52" | 520 m || 
|-id=478 bgcolor=#E9E9E9
| 589478 ||  || — || January 7, 2010 || Mount Lemmon || Mount Lemmon Survey ||  || align=right | 2.2 km || 
|-id=479 bgcolor=#E9E9E9
| 589479 ||  || — || January 6, 2010 || Kitt Peak || Spacewatch ||  || align=right | 1.4 km || 
|-id=480 bgcolor=#E9E9E9
| 589480 ||  || — || January 6, 2010 || Kitt Peak || Spacewatch ||  || align=right data-sort-value="0.92" | 920 m || 
|-id=481 bgcolor=#E9E9E9
| 589481 ||  || — || September 5, 2008 || Kitt Peak || Spacewatch ||  || align=right | 1.3 km || 
|-id=482 bgcolor=#E9E9E9
| 589482 ||  || — || January 8, 2010 || Mount Lemmon || Mount Lemmon Survey ||  || align=right | 1.0 km || 
|-id=483 bgcolor=#E9E9E9
| 589483 ||  || — || January 26, 2006 || Kitt Peak || Spacewatch ||  || align=right | 1.1 km || 
|-id=484 bgcolor=#E9E9E9
| 589484 ||  || — || January 7, 2010 || Kitt Peak || Spacewatch ||  || align=right | 1.3 km || 
|-id=485 bgcolor=#E9E9E9
| 589485 ||  || — || January 7, 2010 || Kitt Peak || Spacewatch ||  || align=right | 1.4 km || 
|-id=486 bgcolor=#E9E9E9
| 589486 ||  || — || January 14, 2002 || Kitt Peak || Spacewatch ||  || align=right data-sort-value="0.87" | 870 m || 
|-id=487 bgcolor=#d6d6d6
| 589487 ||  || — || December 18, 2009 || Mount Lemmon || Mount Lemmon Survey ||  || align=right | 2.7 km || 
|-id=488 bgcolor=#E9E9E9
| 589488 ||  || — || February 2, 2006 || Kitt Peak || Spacewatch ||  || align=right | 1.2 km || 
|-id=489 bgcolor=#E9E9E9
| 589489 ||  || — || February 7, 2006 || Mount Lemmon || Mount Lemmon Survey ||  || align=right | 1.6 km || 
|-id=490 bgcolor=#E9E9E9
| 589490 ||  || — || November 18, 2009 || Mount Lemmon || Mount Lemmon Survey ||  || align=right | 1.6 km || 
|-id=491 bgcolor=#E9E9E9
| 589491 ||  || — || January 23, 2006 || Kitt Peak || Spacewatch ||  || align=right data-sort-value="0.84" | 840 m || 
|-id=492 bgcolor=#E9E9E9
| 589492 ||  || — || January 12, 2010 || Mount Lemmon || Mount Lemmon Survey ||  || align=right | 1.8 km || 
|-id=493 bgcolor=#E9E9E9
| 589493 ||  || — || October 24, 2005 || Mauna Kea || Mauna Kea Obs. || EUN || align=right | 1.3 km || 
|-id=494 bgcolor=#E9E9E9
| 589494 ||  || — || March 5, 2006 || Kitt Peak || Spacewatch ||  || align=right | 1.7 km || 
|-id=495 bgcolor=#E9E9E9
| 589495 ||  || — || November 16, 2009 || Mount Lemmon || Mount Lemmon Survey ||  || align=right | 1.2 km || 
|-id=496 bgcolor=#E9E9E9
| 589496 ||  || — || April 30, 2011 || Haleakala || Pan-STARRS ||  || align=right | 1.9 km || 
|-id=497 bgcolor=#E9E9E9
| 589497 ||  || — || February 19, 2015 || Haleakala || Pan-STARRS ||  || align=right | 1.1 km || 
|-id=498 bgcolor=#E9E9E9
| 589498 ||  || — || January 5, 2010 || Kitt Peak || Spacewatch ||  || align=right | 1.3 km || 
|-id=499 bgcolor=#C2FFFF
| 589499 ||  || — || November 8, 2010 || Mount Lemmon || Mount Lemmon Survey || L4 || align=right | 9.3 km || 
|-id=500 bgcolor=#C2FFFF
| 589500 ||  || — || April 15, 2016 || Haleakala || Pan-STARRS || L4 || align=right | 6.6 km || 
|}

589501–589600 

|-bgcolor=#E9E9E9
| 589501 ||  || — || October 24, 2005 || Mauna Kea || Mauna Kea Obs. ||  || align=right | 1.2 km || 
|-id=502 bgcolor=#fefefe
| 589502 ||  || — || February 9, 2010 || Kitt Peak || Spacewatch ||  || align=right data-sort-value="0.58" | 580 m || 
|-id=503 bgcolor=#E9E9E9
| 589503 ||  || — || February 9, 2010 || Kitt Peak || Spacewatch ||  || align=right | 1.9 km || 
|-id=504 bgcolor=#E9E9E9
| 589504 ||  || — || October 11, 2004 || Palomar || NEAT ||  || align=right | 1.5 km || 
|-id=505 bgcolor=#E9E9E9
| 589505 ||  || — || September 11, 2007 || Mount Lemmon || Mount Lemmon Survey ||  || align=right | 2.2 km || 
|-id=506 bgcolor=#E9E9E9
| 589506 ||  || — || March 9, 2002 || Kitt Peak || Spacewatch ||  || align=right data-sort-value="0.79" | 790 m || 
|-id=507 bgcolor=#E9E9E9
| 589507 ||  || — || January 11, 2010 || Kitt Peak || Spacewatch ||  || align=right | 2.1 km || 
|-id=508 bgcolor=#E9E9E9
| 589508 ||  || — || October 9, 2008 || Kitt Peak || Spacewatch ||  || align=right | 1.6 km || 
|-id=509 bgcolor=#E9E9E9
| 589509 ||  || — || October 12, 2004 || Moletai || K. Černis, J. Zdanavičius ||  || align=right | 1.6 km || 
|-id=510 bgcolor=#E9E9E9
| 589510 ||  || — || February 9, 2010 || Mount Lemmon || Mount Lemmon Survey ||  || align=right | 1.5 km || 
|-id=511 bgcolor=#E9E9E9
| 589511 ||  || — || February 6, 2010 || Mount Lemmon || Mount Lemmon Survey ||  || align=right | 2.0 km || 
|-id=512 bgcolor=#E9E9E9
| 589512 ||  || — || February 10, 2010 || Kitt Peak || Spacewatch ||  || align=right | 2.6 km || 
|-id=513 bgcolor=#E9E9E9
| 589513 ||  || — || January 19, 2005 || Kitt Peak || Spacewatch ||  || align=right | 2.1 km || 
|-id=514 bgcolor=#E9E9E9
| 589514 ||  || — || October 24, 2005 || Mauna Kea || Mauna Kea Obs. ||  || align=right | 2.0 km || 
|-id=515 bgcolor=#E9E9E9
| 589515 ||  || — || October 29, 2003 || Kitt Peak || I. dell'Antonio, D. Wittman ||  || align=right | 1.6 km || 
|-id=516 bgcolor=#E9E9E9
| 589516 ||  || — || February 14, 2010 || Kitt Peak || Spacewatch ||  || align=right | 2.1 km || 
|-id=517 bgcolor=#fefefe
| 589517 ||  || — || February 23, 2007 || Kitt Peak || Spacewatch ||  || align=right data-sort-value="0.55" | 550 m || 
|-id=518 bgcolor=#E9E9E9
| 589518 ||  || — || February 14, 2010 || Mount Lemmon || Mount Lemmon Survey ||  || align=right | 1.5 km || 
|-id=519 bgcolor=#E9E9E9
| 589519 ||  || — || February 14, 2010 || Mount Lemmon || Mount Lemmon Survey ||  || align=right | 1.4 km || 
|-id=520 bgcolor=#E9E9E9
| 589520 ||  || — || February 14, 2010 || Mount Lemmon || Mount Lemmon Survey ||  || align=right | 1.2 km || 
|-id=521 bgcolor=#E9E9E9
| 589521 ||  || — || October 31, 2005 || Mauna Kea || Mauna Kea Obs. ||  || align=right | 1.8 km || 
|-id=522 bgcolor=#fefefe
| 589522 ||  || — || February 14, 2010 || Kitt Peak || Spacewatch ||  || align=right data-sort-value="0.53" | 530 m || 
|-id=523 bgcolor=#E9E9E9
| 589523 ||  || — || February 14, 2010 || Mount Lemmon || Mount Lemmon Survey ||  || align=right | 1.8 km || 
|-id=524 bgcolor=#E9E9E9
| 589524 ||  || — || September 29, 2008 || Kitt Peak || Spacewatch ||  || align=right | 1.6 km || 
|-id=525 bgcolor=#E9E9E9
| 589525 ||  || — || February 14, 2010 || Kitt Peak || Spacewatch ||  || align=right | 1.8 km || 
|-id=526 bgcolor=#fefefe
| 589526 ||  || — || February 14, 2010 || Mount Lemmon || Mount Lemmon Survey || H || align=right data-sort-value="0.38" | 380 m || 
|-id=527 bgcolor=#E9E9E9
| 589527 ||  || — || February 14, 2010 || Mount Lemmon || Mount Lemmon Survey ||  || align=right | 1.2 km || 
|-id=528 bgcolor=#E9E9E9
| 589528 ||  || — || February 14, 2010 || Mount Lemmon || Mount Lemmon Survey ||  || align=right | 1.4 km || 
|-id=529 bgcolor=#E9E9E9
| 589529 ||  || — || September 6, 2008 || Catalina || CSS ||  || align=right | 1.3 km || 
|-id=530 bgcolor=#E9E9E9
| 589530 ||  || — || January 11, 2010 || Kitt Peak || Spacewatch ||  || align=right | 2.9 km || 
|-id=531 bgcolor=#E9E9E9
| 589531 ||  || — || January 11, 2010 || Kitt Peak || Spacewatch ||  || align=right | 1.2 km || 
|-id=532 bgcolor=#E9E9E9
| 589532 ||  || — || January 12, 2010 || Mount Lemmon || Mount Lemmon Survey ||  || align=right | 1.8 km || 
|-id=533 bgcolor=#E9E9E9
| 589533 ||  || — || February 9, 2010 || Catalina || CSS ||  || align=right | 2.2 km || 
|-id=534 bgcolor=#E9E9E9
| 589534 ||  || — || January 30, 2006 || Kitt Peak || Spacewatch ||  || align=right data-sort-value="0.91" | 910 m || 
|-id=535 bgcolor=#E9E9E9
| 589535 ||  || — || February 10, 2010 || Kitt Peak || Spacewatch ||  || align=right | 1.6 km || 
|-id=536 bgcolor=#E9E9E9
| 589536 ||  || — || November 2, 2008 || Mount Lemmon || Mount Lemmon Survey ||  || align=right | 1.9 km || 
|-id=537 bgcolor=#d6d6d6
| 589537 ||  || — || June 8, 2016 || Haleakala || Pan-STARRS ||  || align=right | 2.4 km || 
|-id=538 bgcolor=#E9E9E9
| 589538 ||  || — || September 14, 2013 || Mount Lemmon || Mount Lemmon Survey ||  || align=right data-sort-value="0.77" | 770 m || 
|-id=539 bgcolor=#E9E9E9
| 589539 ||  || — || January 12, 2010 || Kitt Peak || Spacewatch ||  || align=right | 1.4 km || 
|-id=540 bgcolor=#E9E9E9
| 589540 ||  || — || February 23, 2015 || Haleakala || Pan-STARRS ||  || align=right | 1.7 km || 
|-id=541 bgcolor=#E9E9E9
| 589541 ||  || — || December 24, 2013 || Mount Lemmon || Mount Lemmon Survey ||  || align=right | 1.1 km || 
|-id=542 bgcolor=#E9E9E9
| 589542 ||  || — || September 24, 2017 || Haleakala || Pan-STARRS ||  || align=right | 1.7 km || 
|-id=543 bgcolor=#E9E9E9
| 589543 ||  || — || February 27, 2015 || Haleakala || Pan-STARRS ||  || align=right | 1.6 km || 
|-id=544 bgcolor=#fefefe
| 589544 ||  || — || February 14, 2010 || Kitt Peak || Spacewatch ||  || align=right data-sort-value="0.56" | 560 m || 
|-id=545 bgcolor=#E9E9E9
| 589545 ||  || — || January 23, 2006 || Kitt Peak || Spacewatch ||  || align=right | 1.7 km || 
|-id=546 bgcolor=#E9E9E9
| 589546 ||  || — || February 16, 2010 || Mount Lemmon || Mount Lemmon Survey ||  || align=right | 1.0 km || 
|-id=547 bgcolor=#E9E9E9
| 589547 ||  || — || February 16, 2010 || Mount Lemmon || Mount Lemmon Survey ||  || align=right | 1.3 km || 
|-id=548 bgcolor=#E9E9E9
| 589548 ||  || — || October 7, 2008 || Kitt Peak || Spacewatch ||  || align=right | 1.5 km || 
|-id=549 bgcolor=#E9E9E9
| 589549 ||  || — || November 19, 2008 || Mount Lemmon || Mount Lemmon Survey ||  || align=right | 1.1 km || 
|-id=550 bgcolor=#E9E9E9
| 589550 ||  || — || February 17, 2010 || Kitt Peak || Spacewatch ||  || align=right | 1.7 km || 
|-id=551 bgcolor=#E9E9E9
| 589551 ||  || — || September 9, 2007 || Kitt Peak || Spacewatch ||  || align=right | 1.3 km || 
|-id=552 bgcolor=#E9E9E9
| 589552 ||  || — || February 13, 2010 || Mount Lemmon || Mount Lemmon Survey ||  || align=right | 1.7 km || 
|-id=553 bgcolor=#E9E9E9
| 589553 ||  || — || February 17, 2010 || Kitt Peak || Spacewatch ||  || align=right | 1.1 km || 
|-id=554 bgcolor=#E9E9E9
| 589554 ||  || — || May 13, 2015 || Mount Lemmon || Mount Lemmon Survey ||  || align=right | 1.5 km || 
|-id=555 bgcolor=#fefefe
| 589555 ||  || — || February 17, 2010 || Kitt Peak || Spacewatch ||  || align=right data-sort-value="0.55" | 550 m || 
|-id=556 bgcolor=#E9E9E9
| 589556 ||  || — || February 16, 2010 || Mount Lemmon || Mount Lemmon Survey ||  || align=right | 1.7 km || 
|-id=557 bgcolor=#fefefe
| 589557 ||  || — || March 5, 2010 || Catalina || CSS ||  || align=right data-sort-value="0.72" | 720 m || 
|-id=558 bgcolor=#fefefe
| 589558 ||  || — || March 10, 2010 || Moletai || K. Černis, J. Zdanavičius ||  || align=right data-sort-value="0.60" | 600 m || 
|-id=559 bgcolor=#fefefe
| 589559 ||  || — || July 28, 2003 || Palomar || NEAT || H || align=right data-sort-value="0.77" | 770 m || 
|-id=560 bgcolor=#fefefe
| 589560 ||  || — || February 16, 2010 || Mount Lemmon || Mount Lemmon Survey ||  || align=right data-sort-value="0.56" | 560 m || 
|-id=561 bgcolor=#E9E9E9
| 589561 ||  || — || May 26, 2006 || Kitt Peak || Spacewatch ||  || align=right | 2.2 km || 
|-id=562 bgcolor=#E9E9E9
| 589562 ||  || — || March 12, 2010 || Kitt Peak || Spacewatch ||  || align=right | 1.4 km || 
|-id=563 bgcolor=#E9E9E9
| 589563 ||  || — || March 10, 2005 || Mount Lemmon || Mount Lemmon Survey ||  || align=right | 2.1 km || 
|-id=564 bgcolor=#fefefe
| 589564 ||  || — || February 14, 2010 || Kitt Peak || Spacewatch ||  || align=right data-sort-value="0.50" | 500 m || 
|-id=565 bgcolor=#fefefe
| 589565 ||  || — || February 19, 2010 || Mount Lemmon || Mount Lemmon Survey ||  || align=right data-sort-value="0.64" | 640 m || 
|-id=566 bgcolor=#E9E9E9
| 589566 ||  || — || February 18, 2010 || Mount Lemmon || Mount Lemmon Survey ||  || align=right | 1.3 km || 
|-id=567 bgcolor=#E9E9E9
| 589567 ||  || — || March 24, 2001 || Kitt Peak || M. W. Buie, S. D. Kern ||  || align=right | 1.9 km || 
|-id=568 bgcolor=#E9E9E9
| 589568 ||  || — || January 7, 2006 || Kitt Peak || Spacewatch ||  || align=right | 1.7 km || 
|-id=569 bgcolor=#fefefe
| 589569 ||  || — || January 16, 2003 || Palomar || NEAT ||  || align=right data-sort-value="0.67" | 670 m || 
|-id=570 bgcolor=#E9E9E9
| 589570 ||  || — || December 31, 2000 || Haleakala || AMOS ||  || align=right | 1.7 km || 
|-id=571 bgcolor=#fefefe
| 589571 ||  || — || March 12, 2010 || Mount Lemmon || Mount Lemmon Survey ||  || align=right data-sort-value="0.50" | 500 m || 
|-id=572 bgcolor=#E9E9E9
| 589572 ||  || — || March 12, 2010 || Kitt Peak || Spacewatch ||  || align=right | 2.0 km || 
|-id=573 bgcolor=#E9E9E9
| 589573 ||  || — || October 10, 2012 || Haleakala || Pan-STARRS ||  || align=right | 1.7 km || 
|-id=574 bgcolor=#E9E9E9
| 589574 ||  || — || November 20, 2009 || Kitt Peak || Spacewatch ||  || align=right | 1.6 km || 
|-id=575 bgcolor=#E9E9E9
| 589575 ||  || — || October 28, 2017 || Mount Lemmon || Mount Lemmon Survey ||  || align=right | 1.3 km || 
|-id=576 bgcolor=#E9E9E9
| 589576 ||  || — || May 25, 2015 || Haleakala || Pan-STARRS ||  || align=right | 2.0 km || 
|-id=577 bgcolor=#E9E9E9
| 589577 ||  || — || March 14, 2010 || Mount Lemmon || Mount Lemmon Survey ||  || align=right | 1.2 km || 
|-id=578 bgcolor=#E9E9E9
| 589578 ||  || — || April 25, 2006 || Kitt Peak || Spacewatch ||  || align=right | 2.3 km || 
|-id=579 bgcolor=#fefefe
| 589579 ||  || — || March 16, 2010 || Mount Lemmon || Mount Lemmon Survey ||  || align=right data-sort-value="0.63" | 630 m || 
|-id=580 bgcolor=#E9E9E9
| 589580 ||  || — || September 18, 2003 || Kitt Peak || Spacewatch ||  || align=right | 1.3 km || 
|-id=581 bgcolor=#E9E9E9
| 589581 ||  || — || March 16, 2010 || Kitt Peak || Spacewatch ||  || align=right | 2.3 km || 
|-id=582 bgcolor=#fefefe
| 589582 ||  || — || March 17, 2010 || Kitt Peak || Spacewatch ||  || align=right data-sort-value="0.51" | 510 m || 
|-id=583 bgcolor=#fefefe
| 589583 ||  || — || March 18, 2010 || Kitt Peak || Spacewatch ||  || align=right data-sort-value="0.57" | 570 m || 
|-id=584 bgcolor=#E9E9E9
| 589584 ||  || — || March 18, 2010 || Mount Lemmon || Mount Lemmon Survey ||  || align=right | 1.6 km || 
|-id=585 bgcolor=#fefefe
| 589585 ||  || — || March 18, 2010 || Mount Lemmon || Mount Lemmon Survey ||  || align=right data-sort-value="0.54" | 540 m || 
|-id=586 bgcolor=#E9E9E9
| 589586 ||  || — || November 22, 2003 || Kitt Peak || Kitt Peak Obs. ||  || align=right | 1.6 km || 
|-id=587 bgcolor=#E9E9E9
| 589587 ||  || — || March 18, 2010 || Mount Lemmon || Mount Lemmon Survey ||  || align=right | 1.8 km || 
|-id=588 bgcolor=#fefefe
| 589588 ||  || — || March 13, 2010 || Mount Lemmon || Mount Lemmon Survey ||  || align=right data-sort-value="0.55" | 550 m || 
|-id=589 bgcolor=#fefefe
| 589589 ||  || — || March 21, 2010 || Kitt Peak || Spacewatch ||  || align=right data-sort-value="0.67" | 670 m || 
|-id=590 bgcolor=#fefefe
| 589590 ||  || — || March 25, 2010 || Kitt Peak || Spacewatch ||  || align=right data-sort-value="0.62" | 620 m || 
|-id=591 bgcolor=#E9E9E9
| 589591 ||  || — || January 24, 2015 || Kitt Peak || Spacewatch ||  || align=right | 1.7 km || 
|-id=592 bgcolor=#E9E9E9
| 589592 ||  || — || August 1, 2016 || Haleakala || Pan-STARRS ||  || align=right | 1.3 km || 
|-id=593 bgcolor=#fefefe
| 589593 ||  || — || March 18, 2010 || Mount Lemmon || Mount Lemmon Survey ||  || align=right data-sort-value="0.53" | 530 m || 
|-id=594 bgcolor=#fefefe
| 589594 ||  || — || December 2, 2005 || Kitt Peak || Spacewatch ||  || align=right data-sort-value="0.61" | 610 m || 
|-id=595 bgcolor=#E9E9E9
| 589595 ||  || — || November 18, 2003 || Kitt Peak || Spacewatch ||  || align=right | 2.3 km || 
|-id=596 bgcolor=#fefefe
| 589596 ||  || — || December 7, 2005 || Kitt Peak || Spacewatch ||  || align=right data-sort-value="0.60" | 600 m || 
|-id=597 bgcolor=#E9E9E9
| 589597 ||  || — || March 18, 2010 || Kitt Peak || Spacewatch ||  || align=right | 1.9 km || 
|-id=598 bgcolor=#E9E9E9
| 589598 ||  || — || April 9, 2010 || Kitt Peak || Spacewatch ||  || align=right | 2.1 km || 
|-id=599 bgcolor=#E9E9E9
| 589599 ||  || — || April 9, 2010 || Mount Lemmon || Mount Lemmon Survey ||  || align=right | 1.9 km || 
|-id=600 bgcolor=#E9E9E9
| 589600 ||  || — || October 22, 2003 || Kitt Peak || Spacewatch ||  || align=right | 2.3 km || 
|}

589601–589700 

|-bgcolor=#E9E9E9
| 589601 ||  || — || September 21, 2003 || Palomar || NEAT ||  || align=right | 2.2 km || 
|-id=602 bgcolor=#fefefe
| 589602 ||  || — || April 11, 2010 || Kitt Peak || Spacewatch ||  || align=right data-sort-value="0.64" | 640 m || 
|-id=603 bgcolor=#fefefe
| 589603 ||  || — || April 13, 2010 || Mount Lemmon || Mount Lemmon Survey ||  || align=right data-sort-value="0.53" | 530 m || 
|-id=604 bgcolor=#E9E9E9
| 589604 ||  || — || March 11, 2005 || Catalina || CSS ||  || align=right | 3.1 km || 
|-id=605 bgcolor=#fefefe
| 589605 ||  || — || April 8, 2010 || Kitt Peak || Spacewatch ||  || align=right data-sort-value="0.61" | 610 m || 
|-id=606 bgcolor=#E9E9E9
| 589606 ||  || — || April 7, 2010 || Kitt Peak || Spacewatch ||  || align=right | 2.1 km || 
|-id=607 bgcolor=#d6d6d6
| 589607 ||  || — || December 21, 2008 || Kitt Peak || Spacewatch ||  || align=right | 2.0 km || 
|-id=608 bgcolor=#d6d6d6
| 589608 ||  || — || March 19, 2010 || Kitt Peak || Spacewatch ||  || align=right | 1.7 km || 
|-id=609 bgcolor=#fefefe
| 589609 ||  || — || March 20, 2010 || Kitt Peak || Spacewatch ||  || align=right data-sort-value="0.58" | 580 m || 
|-id=610 bgcolor=#fefefe
| 589610 ||  || — || April 10, 2010 || Mount Lemmon || Mount Lemmon Survey ||  || align=right data-sort-value="0.61" | 610 m || 
|-id=611 bgcolor=#E9E9E9
| 589611 ||  || — || May 13, 2010 || Mount Lemmon || Mount Lemmon Survey ||  || align=right | 2.6 km || 
|-id=612 bgcolor=#E9E9E9
| 589612 ||  || — || December 18, 2009 || Mount Lemmon || Mount Lemmon Survey ||  || align=right | 1.6 km || 
|-id=613 bgcolor=#E9E9E9
| 589613 ||  || — || November 27, 2013 || Haleakala || Pan-STARRS ||  || align=right | 1.2 km || 
|-id=614 bgcolor=#E9E9E9
| 589614 ||  || — || September 19, 2012 || Mount Lemmon || Mount Lemmon Survey ||  || align=right | 1.5 km || 
|-id=615 bgcolor=#d6d6d6
| 589615 ||  || — || April 4, 2010 || Kitt Peak || Spacewatch ||  || align=right | 1.8 km || 
|-id=616 bgcolor=#d6d6d6
| 589616 ||  || — || April 30, 2015 || Mount Lemmon || Mount Lemmon Survey ||  || align=right | 2.7 km || 
|-id=617 bgcolor=#d6d6d6
| 589617 ||  || — || April 15, 2010 || Mount Lemmon || Mount Lemmon Survey ||  || align=right | 2.2 km || 
|-id=618 bgcolor=#d6d6d6
| 589618 ||  || — || November 15, 2014 || Mount Lemmon || Mount Lemmon Survey || 3:2 || align=right | 4.0 km || 
|-id=619 bgcolor=#E9E9E9
| 589619 ||  || — || April 9, 2010 || Mount Lemmon || Mount Lemmon Survey ||  || align=right | 1.2 km || 
|-id=620 bgcolor=#d6d6d6
| 589620 ||  || — || September 10, 2016 || Mount Lemmon || Mount Lemmon Survey ||  || align=right | 2.7 km || 
|-id=621 bgcolor=#fefefe
| 589621 ||  || — || April 20, 2010 || Mount Lemmon || Mount Lemmon Survey ||  || align=right data-sort-value="0.60" | 600 m || 
|-id=622 bgcolor=#d6d6d6
| 589622 ||  || — || April 20, 2010 || Mount Lemmon || Mount Lemmon Survey ||  || align=right | 1.6 km || 
|-id=623 bgcolor=#d6d6d6
| 589623 ||  || — || August 11, 2001 || Palomar || NEAT ||  || align=right | 2.9 km || 
|-id=624 bgcolor=#d6d6d6
| 589624 ||  || — || May 6, 2010 || Mount Lemmon || Mount Lemmon Survey ||  || align=right | 2.1 km || 
|-id=625 bgcolor=#fefefe
| 589625 ||  || — || September 13, 2007 || Mount Lemmon || Mount Lemmon Survey ||  || align=right data-sort-value="0.80" | 800 m || 
|-id=626 bgcolor=#d6d6d6
| 589626 ||  || — || May 7, 2010 || Kitt Peak || Spacewatch ||  || align=right | 1.6 km || 
|-id=627 bgcolor=#fefefe
| 589627 ||  || — || April 11, 2003 || Kitt Peak || Spacewatch ||  || align=right data-sort-value="0.55" | 550 m || 
|-id=628 bgcolor=#E9E9E9
| 589628 ||  || — || April 10, 2010 || Mount Lemmon || Mount Lemmon Survey ||  || align=right | 1.9 km || 
|-id=629 bgcolor=#E9E9E9
| 589629 ||  || — || February 17, 2010 || Kitt Peak || Spacewatch ||  || align=right | 3.2 km || 
|-id=630 bgcolor=#fefefe
| 589630 ||  || — || May 12, 2010 || Kitt Peak || Spacewatch ||  || align=right data-sort-value="0.50" | 500 m || 
|-id=631 bgcolor=#E9E9E9
| 589631 ||  || — || September 13, 2007 || Mount Lemmon || Mount Lemmon Survey ||  || align=right | 1.9 km || 
|-id=632 bgcolor=#d6d6d6
| 589632 ||  || — || May 6, 2010 || Mount Lemmon || Mount Lemmon Survey ||  || align=right | 2.6 km || 
|-id=633 bgcolor=#E9E9E9
| 589633 ||  || — || March 14, 2005 || Mount Lemmon || Mount Lemmon Survey ||  || align=right | 1.6 km || 
|-id=634 bgcolor=#E9E9E9
| 589634 ||  || — || September 5, 2007 || Siding Spring || K. Sárneczky, L. Kiss ||  || align=right | 2.1 km || 
|-id=635 bgcolor=#d6d6d6
| 589635 ||  || — || January 25, 2009 || Kitt Peak || Spacewatch ||  || align=right | 2.2 km || 
|-id=636 bgcolor=#fefefe
| 589636 ||  || — || October 23, 2004 || Kitt Peak || Spacewatch ||  || align=right data-sort-value="0.73" | 730 m || 
|-id=637 bgcolor=#E9E9E9
| 589637 ||  || — || April 9, 2010 || Kitt Peak || Spacewatch ||  || align=right | 2.5 km || 
|-id=638 bgcolor=#d6d6d6
| 589638 ||  || — || February 2, 2009 || Kitt Peak || Spacewatch ||  || align=right | 2.0 km || 
|-id=639 bgcolor=#fefefe
| 589639 ||  || — || May 10, 2010 || Mount Lemmon || Mount Lemmon Survey || H || align=right data-sort-value="0.56" | 560 m || 
|-id=640 bgcolor=#d6d6d6
| 589640 ||  || — || April 18, 2009 || Kitt Peak || Spacewatch ||  || align=right | 2.6 km || 
|-id=641 bgcolor=#d6d6d6
| 589641 ||  || — || January 26, 2014 || Haleakala || Pan-STARRS ||  || align=right | 2.0 km || 
|-id=642 bgcolor=#fefefe
| 589642 ||  || — || May 9, 2010 || Siding Spring || SSS ||  || align=right data-sort-value="0.72" | 720 m || 
|-id=643 bgcolor=#d6d6d6
| 589643 ||  || — || November 17, 2011 || Mount Lemmon || Mount Lemmon Survey ||  || align=right | 2.3 km || 
|-id=644 bgcolor=#E9E9E9
| 589644 ||  || — || December 7, 2013 || Nogales || M. Schwartz, P. R. Holvorcem ||  || align=right | 1.3 km || 
|-id=645 bgcolor=#d6d6d6
| 589645 ||  || — || April 25, 2014 || Kitt Peak || Spacewatch ||  || align=right | 2.6 km || 
|-id=646 bgcolor=#d6d6d6
| 589646 ||  || — || October 13, 2016 || Haleakala || Pan-STARRS ||  || align=right | 2.1 km || 
|-id=647 bgcolor=#d6d6d6
| 589647 ||  || — || May 4, 2014 || Haleakala || Pan-STARRS ||  || align=right | 2.6 km || 
|-id=648 bgcolor=#fefefe
| 589648 ||  || — || August 5, 2013 || ESA OGS || ESA OGS || H || align=right data-sort-value="0.57" | 570 m || 
|-id=649 bgcolor=#fefefe
| 589649 ||  || — || May 10, 2002 || Palomar || NEAT || H || align=right data-sort-value="0.74" | 740 m || 
|-id=650 bgcolor=#d6d6d6
| 589650 ||  || — || June 6, 2010 || Kitt Peak || Spacewatch ||  || align=right | 2.3 km || 
|-id=651 bgcolor=#d6d6d6
| 589651 ||  || — || June 11, 2010 || Kitt Peak || Spacewatch ||  || align=right | 2.8 km || 
|-id=652 bgcolor=#fefefe
| 589652 ||  || — || November 30, 2011 || Haleakala || Pan-STARRS ||  || align=right data-sort-value="0.87" | 870 m || 
|-id=653 bgcolor=#d6d6d6
| 589653 ||  || — || October 27, 2005 || Mount Lemmon || Mount Lemmon Survey ||  || align=right | 2.2 km || 
|-id=654 bgcolor=#d6d6d6
| 589654 ||  || — || February 8, 2013 || Haleakala || Pan-STARRS ||  || align=right | 2.7 km || 
|-id=655 bgcolor=#d6d6d6
| 589655 ||  || — || January 13, 2008 || Kitt Peak || Spacewatch ||  || align=right | 2.4 km || 
|-id=656 bgcolor=#d6d6d6
| 589656 ||  || — || October 29, 2005 || Mount Lemmon || Mount Lemmon Survey ||  || align=right | 2.7 km || 
|-id=657 bgcolor=#d6d6d6
| 589657 ||  || — || May 25, 2014 || Haleakala || Pan-STARRS ||  || align=right | 3.6 km || 
|-id=658 bgcolor=#fefefe
| 589658 ||  || — || October 23, 2013 || Haleakala || Pan-STARRS || H || align=right data-sort-value="0.66" | 660 m || 
|-id=659 bgcolor=#d6d6d6
| 589659 ||  || — || June 20, 2010 || Mount Lemmon || Mount Lemmon Survey ||  || align=right | 2.8 km || 
|-id=660 bgcolor=#d6d6d6
| 589660 ||  || — || July 9, 2010 || WISE || WISE ||  || align=right | 1.8 km || 
|-id=661 bgcolor=#E9E9E9
| 589661 ||  || — || March 12, 2005 || Kitt Peak || M. W. Buie, L. H. Wasserman ||  || align=right | 1.7 km || 
|-id=662 bgcolor=#d6d6d6
| 589662 ||  || — || June 2, 2003 || Kitt Peak || Spacewatch ||  || align=right | 3.1 km || 
|-id=663 bgcolor=#d6d6d6
| 589663 ||  || — || January 27, 2007 || Kitt Peak || Spacewatch ||  || align=right | 2.8 km || 
|-id=664 bgcolor=#d6d6d6
| 589664 ||  || — || October 9, 2016 || Haleakala || Pan-STARRS ||  || align=right | 3.4 km || 
|-id=665 bgcolor=#d6d6d6
| 589665 ||  || — || July 16, 2010 || WISE || WISE ||  || align=right | 2.8 km || 
|-id=666 bgcolor=#d6d6d6
| 589666 ||  || — || March 2, 2008 || Kitt Peak || Spacewatch ||  || align=right | 2.6 km || 
|-id=667 bgcolor=#fefefe
| 589667 ||  || — || August 23, 2007 || Kitt Peak || Spacewatch ||  || align=right data-sort-value="0.47" | 470 m || 
|-id=668 bgcolor=#fefefe
| 589668 ||  || — || July 6, 2010 || Mount Lemmon || Mount Lemmon Survey ||  || align=right data-sort-value="0.69" | 690 m || 
|-id=669 bgcolor=#fefefe
| 589669 ||  || — || August 10, 2010 || Kitt Peak || Spacewatch ||  || align=right data-sort-value="0.65" | 650 m || 
|-id=670 bgcolor=#d6d6d6
| 589670 ||  || — || December 28, 2011 || Mount Lemmon || Mount Lemmon Survey ||  || align=right | 3.1 km || 
|-id=671 bgcolor=#E9E9E9
| 589671 ||  || — || March 5, 2014 || Haleakala || Pan-STARRS ||  || align=right | 2.1 km || 
|-id=672 bgcolor=#fefefe
| 589672 ||  || — || April 18, 2013 || Haleakala || Pan-STARRS ||  || align=right data-sort-value="0.67" | 670 m || 
|-id=673 bgcolor=#d6d6d6
| 589673 ||  || — || September 1, 2010 || Mount Lemmon || Mount Lemmon Survey ||  || align=right | 2.0 km || 
|-id=674 bgcolor=#d6d6d6
| 589674 ||  || — || April 1, 2003 || Apache Point || SDSS Collaboration ||  || align=right | 3.5 km || 
|-id=675 bgcolor=#d6d6d6
| 589675 ||  || — || September 2, 2010 || Mount Lemmon || Mount Lemmon Survey ||  || align=right | 2.4 km || 
|-id=676 bgcolor=#d6d6d6
| 589676 ||  || — || September 2, 2010 || Mount Lemmon || Mount Lemmon Survey ||  || align=right | 2.1 km || 
|-id=677 bgcolor=#d6d6d6
| 589677 ||  || — || September 2, 2010 || Mount Lemmon || Mount Lemmon Survey ||  || align=right | 2.1 km || 
|-id=678 bgcolor=#fefefe
| 589678 ||  || — || September 3, 2010 || Mount Lemmon || Mount Lemmon Survey ||  || align=right data-sort-value="0.62" | 620 m || 
|-id=679 bgcolor=#d6d6d6
| 589679 ||  || — || March 9, 2008 || Mount Lemmon || Mount Lemmon Survey ||  || align=right | 3.2 km || 
|-id=680 bgcolor=#fefefe
| 589680 ||  || — || October 11, 2007 || Mount Lemmon || Mount Lemmon Survey ||  || align=right data-sort-value="0.81" | 810 m || 
|-id=681 bgcolor=#d6d6d6
| 589681 ||  || — || September 2, 2010 || Kitt Peak || Spacewatch ||  || align=right | 2.2 km || 
|-id=682 bgcolor=#d6d6d6
| 589682 ||  || — || March 20, 2002 || Kitt Peak || Kitt Peak Obs. ||  || align=right | 3.1 km || 
|-id=683 bgcolor=#C2E0FF
| 589683 ||  || — || September 6, 2010 || La Silla || La Silla Obs. || SDO || align=right | 732 km || 
|-id=684 bgcolor=#d6d6d6
| 589684 ||  || — || March 11, 2003 || Kitt Peak || Spacewatch ||  || align=right | 2.3 km || 
|-id=685 bgcolor=#d6d6d6
| 589685 ||  || — || March 5, 2008 || Kitt Peak || Spacewatch ||  || align=right | 2.4 km || 
|-id=686 bgcolor=#d6d6d6
| 589686 ||  || — || September 11, 2010 || Mount Lemmon || Mount Lemmon Survey ||  || align=right | 3.3 km || 
|-id=687 bgcolor=#d6d6d6
| 589687 ||  || — || March 31, 2008 || Mount Lemmon || Mount Lemmon Survey ||  || align=right | 2.5 km || 
|-id=688 bgcolor=#d6d6d6
| 589688 ||  || — || February 13, 2008 || Kitt Peak || Spacewatch ||  || align=right | 2.5 km || 
|-id=689 bgcolor=#d6d6d6
| 589689 ||  || — || February 28, 2008 || Kitt Peak || Spacewatch ||  || align=right | 2.7 km || 
|-id=690 bgcolor=#d6d6d6
| 589690 ||  || — || January 27, 2007 || Kitt Peak || Spacewatch ||  || align=right | 2.6 km || 
|-id=691 bgcolor=#d6d6d6
| 589691 ||  || — || September 4, 2010 || Mount Lemmon || Mount Lemmon Survey ||  || align=right | 2.7 km || 
|-id=692 bgcolor=#d6d6d6
| 589692 ||  || — || January 28, 2007 || Mount Lemmon || Mount Lemmon Survey ||  || align=right | 2.7 km || 
|-id=693 bgcolor=#d6d6d6
| 589693 ||  || — || September 10, 2010 || Mount Lemmon || Mount Lemmon Survey ||  || align=right | 3.1 km || 
|-id=694 bgcolor=#d6d6d6
| 589694 ||  || — || September 12, 2010 || Mount Lemmon || Mount Lemmon Survey ||  || align=right | 2.7 km || 
|-id=695 bgcolor=#d6d6d6
| 589695 ||  || — || September 2, 2010 || Mount Lemmon || Mount Lemmon Survey ||  || align=right | 2.4 km || 
|-id=696 bgcolor=#fefefe
| 589696 ||  || — || September 9, 2010 || Kitt Peak || Spacewatch ||  || align=right data-sort-value="0.91" | 910 m || 
|-id=697 bgcolor=#d6d6d6
| 589697 ||  || — || September 10, 2010 || Kitt Peak || Spacewatch ||  || align=right | 1.9 km || 
|-id=698 bgcolor=#d6d6d6
| 589698 ||  || — || September 10, 2010 || Kitt Peak || Spacewatch ||  || align=right | 2.2 km || 
|-id=699 bgcolor=#fefefe
| 589699 ||  || — || September 10, 2010 || Kitt Peak || Spacewatch ||  || align=right data-sort-value="0.61" | 610 m || 
|-id=700 bgcolor=#d6d6d6
| 589700 ||  || — || September 11, 2010 || Kitt Peak || Spacewatch ||  || align=right | 2.4 km || 
|}

589701–589800 

|-bgcolor=#d6d6d6
| 589701 ||  || — || September 11, 2010 || Kitt Peak || Spacewatch ||  || align=right | 2.3 km || 
|-id=702 bgcolor=#d6d6d6
| 589702 ||  || — || March 26, 2008 || Mount Lemmon || Mount Lemmon Survey ||  || align=right | 2.4 km || 
|-id=703 bgcolor=#fefefe
| 589703 ||  || — || August 13, 2010 || Kitt Peak || Spacewatch ||  || align=right data-sort-value="0.55" | 550 m || 
|-id=704 bgcolor=#d6d6d6
| 589704 ||  || — || October 9, 2005 || Kitt Peak || Spacewatch ||  || align=right | 3.2 km || 
|-id=705 bgcolor=#fefefe
| 589705 ||  || — || September 15, 2010 || Mount Lemmon || Mount Lemmon Survey ||  || align=right data-sort-value="0.60" | 600 m || 
|-id=706 bgcolor=#d6d6d6
| 589706 ||  || — || November 4, 1999 || Kitt Peak || Spacewatch ||  || align=right | 2.7 km || 
|-id=707 bgcolor=#d6d6d6
| 589707 ||  || — || September 10, 2010 || Mount Lemmon || Mount Lemmon Survey ||  || align=right | 2.5 km || 
|-id=708 bgcolor=#E9E9E9
| 589708 ||  || — || November 12, 2006 || Mount Lemmon || Mount Lemmon Survey ||  || align=right | 2.8 km || 
|-id=709 bgcolor=#fefefe
| 589709 ||  || — || October 3, 2003 || Kitt Peak || Spacewatch ||  || align=right data-sort-value="0.74" | 740 m || 
|-id=710 bgcolor=#fefefe
| 589710 ||  || — || September 14, 2010 || Kitt Peak || Spacewatch ||  || align=right data-sort-value="0.52" | 520 m || 
|-id=711 bgcolor=#d6d6d6
| 589711 ||  || — || April 24, 2003 || Kitt Peak || Spacewatch ||  || align=right | 2.8 km || 
|-id=712 bgcolor=#d6d6d6
| 589712 ||  || — || February 8, 2008 || Kitt Peak || Spacewatch ||  || align=right | 3.2 km || 
|-id=713 bgcolor=#d6d6d6
| 589713 ||  || — || September 1, 2010 || Mount Lemmon || Mount Lemmon Survey ||  || align=right | 2.2 km || 
|-id=714 bgcolor=#d6d6d6
| 589714 ||  || — || September 2, 2010 || Mount Lemmon || Mount Lemmon Survey ||  || align=right | 1.9 km || 
|-id=715 bgcolor=#fefefe
| 589715 ||  || — || September 5, 2010 || Mount Lemmon || Mount Lemmon Survey ||  || align=right data-sort-value="0.54" | 540 m || 
|-id=716 bgcolor=#d6d6d6
| 589716 ||  || — || September 5, 2010 || Mount Lemmon || Mount Lemmon Survey ||  || align=right | 2.9 km || 
|-id=717 bgcolor=#d6d6d6
| 589717 ||  || — || September 6, 2010 || Kitt Peak || Spacewatch || EOS || align=right | 1.5 km || 
|-id=718 bgcolor=#d6d6d6
| 589718 ||  || — || September 6, 2010 || Piszkesteto || Z. Kuli ||  || align=right | 2.1 km || 
|-id=719 bgcolor=#d6d6d6
| 589719 ||  || — || September 8, 2010 || Kitt Peak || Spacewatch ||  || align=right | 2.9 km || 
|-id=720 bgcolor=#fefefe
| 589720 ||  || — || November 9, 2007 || Kitt Peak || Spacewatch ||  || align=right data-sort-value="0.84" | 840 m || 
|-id=721 bgcolor=#d6d6d6
| 589721 ||  || — || September 2, 2010 || Mount Lemmon || Mount Lemmon Survey ||  || align=right | 2.4 km || 
|-id=722 bgcolor=#d6d6d6
| 589722 ||  || — || August 22, 2004 || Kitt Peak || Spacewatch ||  || align=right | 3.2 km || 
|-id=723 bgcolor=#fefefe
| 589723 ||  || — || October 17, 2010 || Catalina || CSS ||  || align=right data-sort-value="0.72" | 720 m || 
|-id=724 bgcolor=#d6d6d6
| 589724 ||  || — || January 3, 2012 || Mount Lemmon || Mount Lemmon Survey ||  || align=right | 3.2 km || 
|-id=725 bgcolor=#fefefe
| 589725 ||  || — || June 7, 2002 || Kitt Peak || Spacewatch ||  || align=right | 1.0 km || 
|-id=726 bgcolor=#d6d6d6
| 589726 ||  || — || October 23, 2011 || Haleakala || Pan-STARRS ||  || align=right | 2.5 km || 
|-id=727 bgcolor=#fefefe
| 589727 ||  || — || April 16, 2013 || Haleakala || Pan-STARRS ||  || align=right data-sort-value="0.67" | 670 m || 
|-id=728 bgcolor=#d6d6d6
| 589728 ||  || — || July 19, 2015 || Haleakala || Pan-STARRS ||  || align=right | 3.1 km || 
|-id=729 bgcolor=#d6d6d6
| 589729 ||  || — || September 2, 2010 || Mount Lemmon || Mount Lemmon Survey ||  || align=right | 2.5 km || 
|-id=730 bgcolor=#d6d6d6
| 589730 ||  || — || May 27, 2014 || Mount Lemmon || Mount Lemmon Survey ||  || align=right | 2.2 km || 
|-id=731 bgcolor=#d6d6d6
| 589731 ||  || — || September 4, 2010 || Mount Lemmon || Mount Lemmon Survey ||  || align=right | 2.2 km || 
|-id=732 bgcolor=#fefefe
| 589732 ||  || — || March 7, 2016 || Haleakala || Pan-STARRS ||  || align=right data-sort-value="0.62" | 620 m || 
|-id=733 bgcolor=#d6d6d6
| 589733 ||  || — || September 15, 2010 || Mount Lemmon || Mount Lemmon Survey ||  || align=right | 2.3 km || 
|-id=734 bgcolor=#d6d6d6
| 589734 ||  || — || September 3, 2010 || Mount Lemmon || Mount Lemmon Survey ||  || align=right | 2.0 km || 
|-id=735 bgcolor=#d6d6d6
| 589735 ||  || — || July 19, 2015 || Haleakala || Pan-STARRS 2 ||  || align=right | 2.1 km || 
|-id=736 bgcolor=#d6d6d6
| 589736 ||  || — || September 4, 2010 || Mount Lemmon || Mount Lemmon Survey ||  || align=right | 2.1 km || 
|-id=737 bgcolor=#d6d6d6
| 589737 ||  || — || September 14, 2010 || Mount Lemmon || Mount Lemmon Survey ||  || align=right | 2.2 km || 
|-id=738 bgcolor=#d6d6d6
| 589738 ||  || — || September 5, 2010 || Mount Lemmon || Mount Lemmon Survey ||  || align=right | 2.7 km || 
|-id=739 bgcolor=#d6d6d6
| 589739 ||  || — || September 11, 2010 || Kitt Peak || Spacewatch ||  || align=right | 2.4 km || 
|-id=740 bgcolor=#d6d6d6
| 589740 ||  || — || September 16, 2010 || Mount Lemmon || Mount Lemmon Survey ||  || align=right | 2.1 km || 
|-id=741 bgcolor=#d6d6d6
| 589741 ||  || — || May 3, 2008 || Mount Lemmon || Mount Lemmon Survey ||  || align=right | 3.2 km || 
|-id=742 bgcolor=#d6d6d6
| 589742 ||  || — || September 18, 2010 || Kitt Peak || Spacewatch ||  || align=right | 1.9 km || 
|-id=743 bgcolor=#d6d6d6
| 589743 ||  || — || March 29, 2008 || Mount Lemmon || Mount Lemmon Survey ||  || align=right | 2.2 km || 
|-id=744 bgcolor=#d6d6d6
| 589744 ||  || — || September 2, 2010 || Mount Lemmon || Mount Lemmon Survey || EOS || align=right | 1.5 km || 
|-id=745 bgcolor=#d6d6d6
| 589745 ||  || — || September 27, 2010 || Charleston || R. Holmes ||  || align=right | 2.5 km || 
|-id=746 bgcolor=#d6d6d6
| 589746 ||  || — || September 29, 2010 || Mount Lemmon || Mount Lemmon Survey ||  || align=right | 2.5 km || 
|-id=747 bgcolor=#d6d6d6
| 589747 ||  || — || September 29, 2010 || Mount Lemmon || Mount Lemmon Survey ||  || align=right | 2.8 km || 
|-id=748 bgcolor=#d6d6d6
| 589748 ||  || — || September 29, 2010 || Mount Lemmon || Mount Lemmon Survey ||  || align=right | 2.3 km || 
|-id=749 bgcolor=#d6d6d6
| 589749 ||  || — || September 29, 2010 || Kitt Peak || Spacewatch ||  || align=right | 2.4 km || 
|-id=750 bgcolor=#d6d6d6
| 589750 ||  || — || September 30, 2010 || Catalina || CSS ||  || align=right | 2.4 km || 
|-id=751 bgcolor=#fefefe
| 589751 ||  || — || September 29, 2010 || Mount Lemmon || Mount Lemmon Survey ||  || align=right data-sort-value="0.74" | 740 m || 
|-id=752 bgcolor=#fefefe
| 589752 ||  || — || September 17, 2010 || Mount Lemmon || Mount Lemmon Survey || V || align=right data-sort-value="0.56" | 560 m || 
|-id=753 bgcolor=#d6d6d6
| 589753 ||  || — || September 1, 2010 || Mount Lemmon || Mount Lemmon Survey ||  || align=right | 2.1 km || 
|-id=754 bgcolor=#fefefe
| 589754 ||  || — || February 20, 2012 || Kitt Peak || Spacewatch ||  || align=right data-sort-value="0.67" | 670 m || 
|-id=755 bgcolor=#d6d6d6
| 589755 ||  || — || September 30, 2010 || Mount Lemmon || Mount Lemmon Survey ||  || align=right | 2.6 km || 
|-id=756 bgcolor=#d6d6d6
| 589756 ||  || — || January 25, 2012 || Haleakala || Pan-STARRS ||  || align=right | 2.3 km || 
|-id=757 bgcolor=#fefefe
| 589757 ||  || — || September 18, 2010 || Mount Lemmon || Mount Lemmon Survey || H || align=right data-sort-value="0.57" | 570 m || 
|-id=758 bgcolor=#fefefe
| 589758 ||  || — || January 14, 2016 || Haleakala || Pan-STARRS ||  || align=right data-sort-value="0.70" | 700 m || 
|-id=759 bgcolor=#d6d6d6
| 589759 ||  || — || March 8, 2013 || Haleakala || Pan-STARRS ||  || align=right | 2.2 km || 
|-id=760 bgcolor=#d6d6d6
| 589760 ||  || — || September 17, 2010 || Mount Lemmon || Mount Lemmon Survey ||  || align=right | 2.4 km || 
|-id=761 bgcolor=#d6d6d6
| 589761 ||  || — || April 30, 2014 || Haleakala || Pan-STARRS ||  || align=right | 2.4 km || 
|-id=762 bgcolor=#fefefe
| 589762 ||  || — || September 30, 2010 || Mount Lemmon || Mount Lemmon Survey ||  || align=right data-sort-value="0.59" | 590 m || 
|-id=763 bgcolor=#d6d6d6
| 589763 ||  || — || September 19, 2010 || Kitt Peak || Spacewatch ||  || align=right | 2.1 km || 
|-id=764 bgcolor=#d6d6d6
| 589764 ||  || — || September 12, 2010 || Kitt Peak || Spacewatch ||  || align=right | 2.6 km || 
|-id=765 bgcolor=#d6d6d6
| 589765 ||  || — || October 22, 2005 || Kitt Peak || Spacewatch ||  || align=right | 2.1 km || 
|-id=766 bgcolor=#d6d6d6
| 589766 ||  || — || February 13, 2003 || La Silla || R. Michelsen, G. Masi ||  || align=right | 2.1 km || 
|-id=767 bgcolor=#d6d6d6
| 589767 ||  || — || September 10, 2010 || Kitt Peak || Spacewatch ||  || align=right | 2.0 km || 
|-id=768 bgcolor=#d6d6d6
| 589768 ||  || — || October 3, 2010 || Kitt Peak || Spacewatch ||  || align=right | 3.0 km || 
|-id=769 bgcolor=#d6d6d6
| 589769 ||  || — || October 3, 2010 || Kitt Peak || Spacewatch ||  || align=right | 2.1 km || 
|-id=770 bgcolor=#fefefe
| 589770 ||  || — || November 21, 2008 || Mount Lemmon || Mount Lemmon Survey || H || align=right data-sort-value="0.83" | 830 m || 
|-id=771 bgcolor=#d6d6d6
| 589771 ||  || — || October 1, 2010 || Kitt Peak || Spacewatch ||  || align=right | 2.3 km || 
|-id=772 bgcolor=#d6d6d6
| 589772 ||  || — || April 15, 2008 || Kitt Peak || Spacewatch ||  || align=right | 2.8 km || 
|-id=773 bgcolor=#d6d6d6
| 589773 ||  || — || October 1, 2005 || Mount Lemmon || Mount Lemmon Survey ||  || align=right | 2.2 km || 
|-id=774 bgcolor=#fefefe
| 589774 ||  || — || October 2, 2010 || Kitt Peak || Spacewatch ||  || align=right data-sort-value="0.57" | 570 m || 
|-id=775 bgcolor=#d6d6d6
| 589775 ||  || — || October 2, 2010 || Kitt Peak || Spacewatch ||  || align=right | 2.3 km || 
|-id=776 bgcolor=#d6d6d6
| 589776 ||  || — || July 11, 2004 || Palomar || NEAT || TIR || align=right | 3.1 km || 
|-id=777 bgcolor=#fefefe
| 589777 ||  || — || November 29, 2003 || Kitt Peak || Spacewatch ||  || align=right data-sort-value="0.63" | 630 m || 
|-id=778 bgcolor=#d6d6d6
| 589778 ||  || — || October 27, 2005 || Kitt Peak || Spacewatch ||  || align=right | 2.1 km || 
|-id=779 bgcolor=#d6d6d6
| 589779 ||  || — || September 15, 2010 || Kitt Peak || Spacewatch ||  || align=right | 2.3 km || 
|-id=780 bgcolor=#d6d6d6
| 589780 ||  || — || October 7, 2010 || Piszkesteto || Z. Kuli ||  || align=right | 3.6 km || 
|-id=781 bgcolor=#E9E9E9
| 589781 ||  || — || October 7, 2010 || Mount Lemmon || Mount Lemmon Survey ||  || align=right | 1.1 km || 
|-id=782 bgcolor=#fefefe
| 589782 ||  || — || September 18, 2010 || Mount Lemmon || Mount Lemmon Survey || H || align=right data-sort-value="0.62" | 620 m || 
|-id=783 bgcolor=#fefefe
| 589783 ||  || — || October 8, 1999 || Kitt Peak || Spacewatch ||  || align=right data-sort-value="0.61" | 610 m || 
|-id=784 bgcolor=#d6d6d6
| 589784 ||  || — || October 8, 2010 || Kitt Peak || Spacewatch ||  || align=right | 2.5 km || 
|-id=785 bgcolor=#fefefe
| 589785 ||  || — || October 8, 2010 || Kitt Peak || Spacewatch ||  || align=right data-sort-value="0.70" | 700 m || 
|-id=786 bgcolor=#fefefe
| 589786 ||  || — || October 9, 2010 || Bergisch Gladbach || W. Bickel ||  || align=right data-sort-value="0.78" | 780 m || 
|-id=787 bgcolor=#d6d6d6
| 589787 ||  || — || October 9, 2010 || Kitt Peak || Spacewatch ||  || align=right | 2.1 km || 
|-id=788 bgcolor=#d6d6d6
| 589788 ||  || — || September 16, 2010 || Kitt Peak || Spacewatch ||  || align=right | 1.8 km || 
|-id=789 bgcolor=#d6d6d6
| 589789 ||  || — || April 29, 2008 || Mount Lemmon || Mount Lemmon Survey ||  || align=right | 2.7 km || 
|-id=790 bgcolor=#d6d6d6
| 589790 ||  || — || September 19, 2010 || Kitt Peak || Spacewatch ||  || align=right | 2.4 km || 
|-id=791 bgcolor=#d6d6d6
| 589791 ||  || — || October 9, 2010 || Desert Moon || B. L. Stevens ||  || align=right | 2.2 km || 
|-id=792 bgcolor=#E9E9E9
| 589792 ||  || — || September 28, 1997 || Kitt Peak || Spacewatch ||  || align=right | 1.3 km || 
|-id=793 bgcolor=#fefefe
| 589793 ||  || — || February 28, 2009 || Kitt Peak || Spacewatch ||  || align=right data-sort-value="0.74" | 740 m || 
|-id=794 bgcolor=#d6d6d6
| 589794 ||  || — || October 9, 2010 || Kitt Peak || Spacewatch ||  || align=right | 2.2 km || 
|-id=795 bgcolor=#d6d6d6
| 589795 ||  || — || September 16, 2010 || Kitt Peak || Spacewatch ||  || align=right | 2.2 km || 
|-id=796 bgcolor=#fefefe
| 589796 ||  || — || October 9, 2010 || Mount Lemmon || Mount Lemmon Survey ||  || align=right data-sort-value="0.64" | 640 m || 
|-id=797 bgcolor=#d6d6d6
| 589797 ||  || — || April 18, 2009 || Mount Lemmon || Mount Lemmon Survey ||  || align=right | 2.0 km || 
|-id=798 bgcolor=#fefefe
| 589798 ||  || — || October 10, 2010 || Kitt Peak || Spacewatch ||  || align=right data-sort-value="0.68" | 680 m || 
|-id=799 bgcolor=#d6d6d6
| 589799 ||  || — || October 10, 2010 || Kitt Peak || Spacewatch ||  || align=right | 2.4 km || 
|-id=800 bgcolor=#d6d6d6
| 589800 ||  || — || August 25, 2004 || Kitt Peak || Spacewatch ||  || align=right | 2.8 km || 
|}

589801–589900 

|-bgcolor=#d6d6d6
| 589801 ||  || — || February 21, 2007 || Kitt Peak || Spacewatch ||  || align=right | 2.2 km || 
|-id=802 bgcolor=#d6d6d6
| 589802 ||  || — || October 11, 2010 || Mount Lemmon || Mount Lemmon Survey ||  || align=right | 2.3 km || 
|-id=803 bgcolor=#d6d6d6
| 589803 ||  || — || September 16, 2010 || Mount Lemmon || Mount Lemmon Survey ||  || align=right | 2.7 km || 
|-id=804 bgcolor=#d6d6d6
| 589804 ||  || — || October 11, 2010 || Mount Lemmon || Mount Lemmon Survey ||  || align=right | 2.6 km || 
|-id=805 bgcolor=#fefefe
| 589805 ||  || — || May 20, 2005 || Mount Lemmon || Mount Lemmon Survey ||  || align=right data-sort-value="0.67" | 670 m || 
|-id=806 bgcolor=#fefefe
| 589806 ||  || — || October 22, 2003 || Kitt Peak || Spacewatch ||  || align=right data-sort-value="0.81" | 810 m || 
|-id=807 bgcolor=#d6d6d6
| 589807 ||  || — || September 3, 2010 || Mount Lemmon || Mount Lemmon Survey ||  || align=right | 2.5 km || 
|-id=808 bgcolor=#fefefe
| 589808 ||  || — || October 13, 2010 || Tzec Maun || E. Schwab ||  || align=right data-sort-value="0.77" | 770 m || 
|-id=809 bgcolor=#d6d6d6
| 589809 ||  || — || September 18, 2010 || Mount Lemmon || Mount Lemmon Survey ||  || align=right | 2.1 km || 
|-id=810 bgcolor=#d6d6d6
| 589810 ||  || — || April 8, 2002 || Cerro Tololo || M. W. Buie, A. B. Jordan ||  || align=right | 2.3 km || 
|-id=811 bgcolor=#d6d6d6
| 589811 ||  || — || September 17, 2010 || Mount Lemmon || Mount Lemmon Survey ||  || align=right | 2.5 km || 
|-id=812 bgcolor=#fefefe
| 589812 ||  || — || September 16, 2010 || Kitt Peak || Spacewatch ||  || align=right data-sort-value="0.76" | 760 m || 
|-id=813 bgcolor=#fefefe
| 589813 ||  || — || July 22, 2010 || Siding Spring || SSS ||  || align=right data-sort-value="0.88" | 880 m || 
|-id=814 bgcolor=#d6d6d6
| 589814 ||  || — || January 29, 2012 || Haleakala || Pan-STARRS ||  || align=right | 3.0 km || 
|-id=815 bgcolor=#d6d6d6
| 589815 ||  || — || October 28, 2005 || Kitt Peak || Spacewatch ||  || align=right | 2.9 km || 
|-id=816 bgcolor=#d6d6d6
| 589816 ||  || — || October 2, 2016 || Mount Lemmon || Mount Lemmon Survey ||  || align=right | 2.7 km || 
|-id=817 bgcolor=#d6d6d6
| 589817 ||  || — || February 18, 2013 || Kitt Peak || Spacewatch ||  || align=right | 2.4 km || 
|-id=818 bgcolor=#fefefe
| 589818 ||  || — || June 13, 2010 || Mount Lemmon || Mount Lemmon Survey ||  || align=right data-sort-value="0.78" | 780 m || 
|-id=819 bgcolor=#fefefe
| 589819 ||  || — || October 9, 2010 || Mount Lemmon || Mount Lemmon Survey ||  || align=right | 1.1 km || 
|-id=820 bgcolor=#d6d6d6
| 589820 ||  || — || October 9, 2010 || Mount Lemmon || Mount Lemmon Survey ||  || align=right | 2.4 km || 
|-id=821 bgcolor=#d6d6d6
| 589821 ||  || — || July 25, 2015 || Haleakala || Pan-STARRS ||  || align=right | 3.1 km || 
|-id=822 bgcolor=#fefefe
| 589822 ||  || — || April 12, 2013 || Haleakala || Pan-STARRS ||  || align=right data-sort-value="0.56" | 560 m || 
|-id=823 bgcolor=#d6d6d6
| 589823 ||  || — || October 22, 2005 || Kitt Peak || Spacewatch ||  || align=right | 3.1 km || 
|-id=824 bgcolor=#d6d6d6
| 589824 ||  || — || January 16, 2018 || Haleakala || Pan-STARRS ||  || align=right | 2.3 km || 
|-id=825 bgcolor=#fefefe
| 589825 ||  || — || October 13, 2010 || Mount Lemmon || Mount Lemmon Survey ||  || align=right data-sort-value="0.66" | 660 m || 
|-id=826 bgcolor=#d6d6d6
| 589826 ||  || — || November 18, 2016 || Mount Lemmon || Mount Lemmon Survey ||  || align=right | 2.5 km || 
|-id=827 bgcolor=#d6d6d6
| 589827 ||  || — || October 14, 2010 || Mount Lemmon || Mount Lemmon Survey ||  || align=right | 2.2 km || 
|-id=828 bgcolor=#d6d6d6
| 589828 ||  || — || October 14, 2010 || Mount Lemmon || Mount Lemmon Survey ||  || align=right | 2.6 km || 
|-id=829 bgcolor=#d6d6d6
| 589829 ||  || — || October 12, 2010 || Mount Lemmon || Mount Lemmon Survey ||  || align=right | 2.1 km || 
|-id=830 bgcolor=#fefefe
| 589830 ||  || — || October 1, 2010 || Kitt Peak || Spacewatch ||  || align=right data-sort-value="0.66" | 660 m || 
|-id=831 bgcolor=#d6d6d6
| 589831 ||  || — || October 2, 2010 || Mount Lemmon || Mount Lemmon Survey ||  || align=right | 2.3 km || 
|-id=832 bgcolor=#d6d6d6
| 589832 ||  || — || July 20, 2004 || Siding Spring || SSS ||  || align=right | 2.5 km || 
|-id=833 bgcolor=#d6d6d6
| 589833 ||  || — || October 1, 2010 || Kitt Peak || Spacewatch ||  || align=right | 1.7 km || 
|-id=834 bgcolor=#C2FFFF
| 589834 ||  || — || October 12, 2010 || Mount Lemmon || Mount Lemmon Survey || L4 || align=right | 6.5 km || 
|-id=835 bgcolor=#d6d6d6
| 589835 ||  || — || October 17, 2010 || Mount Lemmon || Mount Lemmon Survey ||  || align=right | 2.9 km || 
|-id=836 bgcolor=#fefefe
| 589836 ||  || — || August 16, 2006 || Siding Spring || SSS || MAS || align=right data-sort-value="0.68" | 680 m || 
|-id=837 bgcolor=#fefefe
| 589837 ||  || — || November 18, 2003 || Kitt Peak || Spacewatch ||  || align=right data-sort-value="0.61" | 610 m || 
|-id=838 bgcolor=#fefefe
| 589838 ||  || — || February 28, 2008 || Kitt Peak || Spacewatch ||  || align=right data-sort-value="0.91" | 910 m || 
|-id=839 bgcolor=#d6d6d6
| 589839 ||  || — || September 17, 2010 || Mount Lemmon || Mount Lemmon Survey ||  || align=right | 2.3 km || 
|-id=840 bgcolor=#fefefe
| 589840 ||  || — || November 15, 1995 || Kitt Peak || Spacewatch ||  || align=right data-sort-value="0.64" | 640 m || 
|-id=841 bgcolor=#d6d6d6
| 589841 ||  || — || October 28, 2010 || Piszkesteto || Z. Kuli, K. Sárneczky ||  || align=right | 2.3 km || 
|-id=842 bgcolor=#d6d6d6
| 589842 ||  || — || October 29, 2010 || Catalina || CSS ||  || align=right | 4.5 km || 
|-id=843 bgcolor=#d6d6d6
| 589843 ||  || — || September 17, 2010 || Mount Lemmon || Mount Lemmon Survey ||  || align=right | 2.7 km || 
|-id=844 bgcolor=#d6d6d6
| 589844 ||  || — || May 11, 2007 || Mount Lemmon || Mount Lemmon Survey ||  || align=right | 3.1 km || 
|-id=845 bgcolor=#fefefe
| 589845 ||  || — || October 17, 2010 || Mount Lemmon || Mount Lemmon Survey || H || align=right data-sort-value="0.74" | 740 m || 
|-id=846 bgcolor=#d6d6d6
| 589846 ||  || — || April 19, 2007 || Mount Lemmon || Mount Lemmon Survey ||  || align=right | 2.5 km || 
|-id=847 bgcolor=#d6d6d6
| 589847 ||  || — || October 31, 2010 || Piszkesteto || Z. Kuli, K. Sárneczky || Tj (2.99) || align=right | 4.2 km || 
|-id=848 bgcolor=#d6d6d6
| 589848 ||  || — || February 21, 2007 || Kitt Peak || Spacewatch ||  || align=right | 2.0 km || 
|-id=849 bgcolor=#fefefe
| 589849 ||  || — || February 28, 2008 || Mount Lemmon || Mount Lemmon Survey ||  || align=right data-sort-value="0.65" | 650 m || 
|-id=850 bgcolor=#d6d6d6
| 589850 ||  || — || October 13, 2010 || Mount Lemmon || Mount Lemmon Survey ||  || align=right | 2.5 km || 
|-id=851 bgcolor=#fefefe
| 589851 ||  || — || September 3, 2010 || Mount Lemmon || Mount Lemmon Survey || H || align=right data-sort-value="0.61" | 610 m || 
|-id=852 bgcolor=#d6d6d6
| 589852 ||  || — || October 12, 2010 || Mount Lemmon || Mount Lemmon Survey ||  || align=right | 2.5 km || 
|-id=853 bgcolor=#fefefe
| 589853 ||  || — || August 27, 2006 || Kitt Peak || Spacewatch ||  || align=right data-sort-value="0.59" | 590 m || 
|-id=854 bgcolor=#d6d6d6
| 589854 ||  || — || October 12, 2016 || Haleakala || Pan-STARRS ||  || align=right | 2.5 km || 
|-id=855 bgcolor=#d6d6d6
| 589855 ||  || — || November 24, 2011 || Haleakala || Pan-STARRS ||  || align=right | 2.6 km || 
|-id=856 bgcolor=#d6d6d6
| 589856 ||  || — || December 28, 2011 || Mount Lemmon || Mount Lemmon Survey ||  || align=right | 2.9 km || 
|-id=857 bgcolor=#d6d6d6
| 589857 ||  || — || October 17, 2010 || Mount Lemmon || Mount Lemmon Survey ||  || align=right | 2.8 km || 
|-id=858 bgcolor=#d6d6d6
| 589858 ||  || — || December 29, 2011 || Mount Lemmon || Mount Lemmon Survey ||  || align=right | 2.3 km || 
|-id=859 bgcolor=#d6d6d6
| 589859 ||  || — || October 17, 2010 || Mount Lemmon || Mount Lemmon Survey ||  || align=right | 2.1 km || 
|-id=860 bgcolor=#d6d6d6
| 589860 ||  || — || September 18, 2010 || Mount Lemmon || Mount Lemmon Survey ||  || align=right | 2.7 km || 
|-id=861 bgcolor=#d6d6d6
| 589861 ||  || — || October 28, 2010 || Mount Lemmon || Mount Lemmon Survey ||  || align=right | 2.4 km || 
|-id=862 bgcolor=#d6d6d6
| 589862 ||  || — || October 28, 2010 || Mount Lemmon || Mount Lemmon Survey ||  || align=right | 2.2 km || 
|-id=863 bgcolor=#d6d6d6
| 589863 ||  || — || October 31, 2010 || Mount Lemmon || Mount Lemmon Survey ||  || align=right | 2.9 km || 
|-id=864 bgcolor=#C2FFFF
| 589864 ||  || — || October 30, 2010 || Kitt Peak || Spacewatch || L4 || align=right | 7.2 km || 
|-id=865 bgcolor=#d6d6d6
| 589865 ||  || — || October 30, 2010 || Mount Lemmon || Mount Lemmon Survey ||  || align=right | 2.6 km || 
|-id=866 bgcolor=#C2FFFF
| 589866 ||  || — || November 1, 2010 || Mount Lemmon || Mount Lemmon Survey || L4 || align=right | 6.5 km || 
|-id=867 bgcolor=#fefefe
| 589867 ||  || — || October 11, 2010 || Catalina || CSS || H || align=right data-sort-value="0.53" | 530 m || 
|-id=868 bgcolor=#C2FFFF
| 589868 ||  || — || November 2, 2010 || Kitt Peak || Spacewatch || L4 || align=right | 6.4 km || 
|-id=869 bgcolor=#fefefe
| 589869 ||  || — || November 19, 2003 || Kitt Peak || Spacewatch ||  || align=right data-sort-value="0.75" | 750 m || 
|-id=870 bgcolor=#C2FFFF
| 589870 ||  || — || November 1, 2010 || Kitt Peak || Spacewatch || L4 || align=right | 7.2 km || 
|-id=871 bgcolor=#fefefe
| 589871 ||  || — || August 20, 2006 || Palomar || NEAT ||  || align=right data-sort-value="0.77" | 770 m || 
|-id=872 bgcolor=#fefefe
| 589872 ||  || — || August 12, 2006 || Palomar || NEAT ||  || align=right | 1.1 km || 
|-id=873 bgcolor=#d6d6d6
| 589873 ||  || — || August 14, 2015 || Haleakala || Pan-STARRS ||  || align=right | 2.2 km || 
|-id=874 bgcolor=#d6d6d6
| 589874 ||  || — || September 18, 2010 || Mount Lemmon || Mount Lemmon Survey ||  || align=right | 2.7 km || 
|-id=875 bgcolor=#fefefe
| 589875 ||  || — || October 11, 2010 || Mount Lemmon || Mount Lemmon Survey ||  || align=right data-sort-value="0.80" | 800 m || 
|-id=876 bgcolor=#fefefe
| 589876 ||  || — || November 3, 2010 || Kitt Peak || Spacewatch ||  || align=right data-sort-value="0.79" | 790 m || 
|-id=877 bgcolor=#C2FFFF
| 589877 ||  || — || October 14, 2009 || Mount Lemmon || Mount Lemmon Survey || L4 || align=right | 6.6 km || 
|-id=878 bgcolor=#d6d6d6
| 589878 ||  || — || September 15, 2004 || Kitt Peak || Spacewatch ||  || align=right | 2.6 km || 
|-id=879 bgcolor=#C2FFFF
| 589879 ||  || — || November 5, 2010 || Kitt Peak || Spacewatch || L4 || align=right | 7.5 km || 
|-id=880 bgcolor=#d6d6d6
| 589880 ||  || — || November 3, 2010 || Mount Lemmon || Mount Lemmon Survey ||  || align=right | 2.7 km || 
|-id=881 bgcolor=#C2FFFF
| 589881 ||  || — || September 15, 2009 || Kitt Peak || Spacewatch || L4 || align=right | 5.7 km || 
|-id=882 bgcolor=#C2FFFF
| 589882 ||  || — || November 6, 2010 || Kitt Peak || Spacewatch || L4 || align=right | 6.9 km || 
|-id=883 bgcolor=#d6d6d6
| 589883 ||  || — || October 13, 2010 || Mount Lemmon || Mount Lemmon Survey ||  || align=right | 2.4 km || 
|-id=884 bgcolor=#d6d6d6
| 589884 ||  || — || November 6, 2010 || Socorro || LINEAR || Tj (2.99) || align=right | 4.0 km || 
|-id=885 bgcolor=#C2FFFF
| 589885 ||  || — || September 23, 1995 || Kitt Peak || Spacewatch || L4 || align=right | 9.5 km || 
|-id=886 bgcolor=#C2FFFF
| 589886 ||  || — || November 7, 2010 || Mount Lemmon || Mount Lemmon Survey || L4 || align=right | 7.5 km || 
|-id=887 bgcolor=#d6d6d6
| 589887 ||  || — || October 31, 2010 || Piszkesteto || Z. Kuli ||  || align=right | 4.0 km || 
|-id=888 bgcolor=#d6d6d6
| 589888 ||  || — || November 8, 2010 || Kitt Peak || Spacewatch ||  || align=right | 2.9 km || 
|-id=889 bgcolor=#fefefe
| 589889 ||  || — || October 16, 2006 || Kitt Peak || Spacewatch ||  || align=right data-sort-value="0.81" | 810 m || 
|-id=890 bgcolor=#fefefe
| 589890 ||  || — || May 24, 2001 || Cerro Tololo || J. L. Elliot, L. H. Wasserman ||  || align=right data-sort-value="0.66" | 660 m || 
|-id=891 bgcolor=#d6d6d6
| 589891 ||  || — || November 1, 2010 || Mount Lemmon || Mount Lemmon Survey ||  || align=right | 3.3 km || 
|-id=892 bgcolor=#fefefe
| 589892 ||  || — || September 30, 2006 || Mount Lemmon || Mount Lemmon Survey ||  || align=right data-sort-value="0.71" | 710 m || 
|-id=893 bgcolor=#fefefe
| 589893 ||  || — || June 5, 2005 || Junk Bond || D. Healy || NYS || align=right data-sort-value="0.69" | 690 m || 
|-id=894 bgcolor=#fefefe
| 589894 ||  || — || June 8, 2005 || Kitt Peak || Spacewatch ||  || align=right data-sort-value="0.72" | 720 m || 
|-id=895 bgcolor=#d6d6d6
| 589895 ||  || — || October 9, 2010 || Mount Lemmon || Mount Lemmon Survey ||  || align=right | 2.5 km || 
|-id=896 bgcolor=#C2FFFF
| 589896 ||  || — || November 10, 2010 || Mount Lemmon || Mount Lemmon Survey || L4 || align=right | 9.6 km || 
|-id=897 bgcolor=#d6d6d6
| 589897 ||  || — || September 14, 2004 || Palomar || NEAT ||  || align=right | 4.1 km || 
|-id=898 bgcolor=#d6d6d6
| 589898 ||  || — || November 6, 2010 || Kitt Peak || Spacewatch ||  || align=right | 3.3 km || 
|-id=899 bgcolor=#d6d6d6
| 589899 ||  || — || October 28, 2010 || Mount Lemmon || Mount Lemmon Survey ||  || align=right | 2.0 km || 
|-id=900 bgcolor=#d6d6d6
| 589900 ||  || — || January 23, 2006 || Mount Lemmon || Mount Lemmon Survey || THM || align=right | 2.1 km || 
|}

589901–590000 

|-bgcolor=#d6d6d6
| 589901 ||  || — || November 12, 2010 || Kitt Peak || Spacewatch ||  || align=right | 2.9 km || 
|-id=902 bgcolor=#C2FFFF
| 589902 ||  || — || November 11, 2010 || Kitt Peak || Spacewatch || L4 || align=right | 6.6 km || 
|-id=903 bgcolor=#fefefe
| 589903 ||  || — || November 4, 2010 || Mayhill-ISON || L. Elenin ||  || align=right data-sort-value="0.88" | 880 m || 
|-id=904 bgcolor=#d6d6d6
| 589904 ||  || — || November 13, 2010 || Mount Lemmon || Mount Lemmon Survey ||  || align=right | 2.9 km || 
|-id=905 bgcolor=#d6d6d6
| 589905 ||  || — || November 8, 2010 || Mount Lemmon || Mount Lemmon Survey || Tj (2.99) || align=right | 4.1 km || 
|-id=906 bgcolor=#d6d6d6
| 589906 ||  || — || September 18, 2010 || Mount Lemmon || Mount Lemmon Survey ||  || align=right | 2.4 km || 
|-id=907 bgcolor=#d6d6d6
| 589907 ||  || — || October 30, 2010 || Catalina || CSS ||  || align=right | 2.7 km || 
|-id=908 bgcolor=#d6d6d6
| 589908 ||  || — || October 31, 2010 || Kitt Peak || Spacewatch ||  || align=right | 3.3 km || 
|-id=909 bgcolor=#C2FFFF
| 589909 ||  || — || October 16, 2009 || Mount Lemmon || Mount Lemmon Survey || L4 || align=right | 5.4 km || 
|-id=910 bgcolor=#fefefe
| 589910 ||  || — || March 18, 2009 || Mount Lemmon || Mount Lemmon Survey || H || align=right data-sort-value="0.75" | 750 m || 
|-id=911 bgcolor=#d6d6d6
| 589911 ||  || — || November 26, 2011 || Mount Lemmon || Mount Lemmon Survey ||  || align=right | 3.2 km || 
|-id=912 bgcolor=#d6d6d6
| 589912 ||  || — || July 11, 2009 || Kitt Peak || Spacewatch ||  || align=right | 3.7 km || 
|-id=913 bgcolor=#d6d6d6
| 589913 ||  || — || November 2, 2010 || Mount Lemmon || Mount Lemmon Survey ||  || align=right | 2.9 km || 
|-id=914 bgcolor=#d6d6d6
| 589914 ||  || — || July 28, 2014 || Haleakala || Pan-STARRS ||  || align=right | 3.1 km || 
|-id=915 bgcolor=#fefefe
| 589915 ||  || — || November 17, 2014 || Mount Lemmon || Mount Lemmon Survey ||  || align=right data-sort-value="0.87" | 870 m || 
|-id=916 bgcolor=#d6d6d6
| 589916 ||  || — || August 21, 2015 || Haleakala || Pan-STARRS ||  || align=right | 2.2 km || 
|-id=917 bgcolor=#E9E9E9
| 589917 ||  || — || November 1, 2010 || Mount Lemmon || Mount Lemmon Survey ||  || align=right | 1.8 km || 
|-id=918 bgcolor=#d6d6d6
| 589918 ||  || — || November 6, 2010 || Catalina || CSS ||  || align=right | 3.1 km || 
|-id=919 bgcolor=#d6d6d6
| 589919 ||  || — || December 23, 2017 || Haleakala || Pan-STARRS ||  || align=right | 2.8 km || 
|-id=920 bgcolor=#d6d6d6
| 589920 ||  || — || November 13, 2010 || Mount Lemmon || Mount Lemmon Survey ||  || align=right | 2.6 km || 
|-id=921 bgcolor=#fefefe
| 589921 ||  || — || August 15, 2013 || Haleakala || Pan-STARRS ||  || align=right data-sort-value="0.51" | 510 m || 
|-id=922 bgcolor=#d6d6d6
| 589922 ||  || — || July 23, 2015 || Haleakala || Pan-STARRS ||  || align=right | 2.0 km || 
|-id=923 bgcolor=#d6d6d6
| 589923 ||  || — || November 4, 2010 || Mount Lemmon || Mount Lemmon Survey ||  || align=right | 3.6 km || 
|-id=924 bgcolor=#C2FFFF
| 589924 ||  || — || October 22, 2009 || Mount Lemmon || Mount Lemmon Survey || L4 || align=right | 7.2 km || 
|-id=925 bgcolor=#d6d6d6
| 589925 ||  || — || November 13, 2010 || Kitt Peak || Spacewatch ||  || align=right | 3.2 km || 
|-id=926 bgcolor=#d6d6d6
| 589926 ||  || — || November 13, 2010 || Mount Lemmon || Mount Lemmon Survey ||  || align=right | 2.7 km || 
|-id=927 bgcolor=#C2FFFF
| 589927 ||  || — || November 1, 2010 || Mount Lemmon || Mount Lemmon Survey || L4 || align=right | 7.2 km || 
|-id=928 bgcolor=#d6d6d6
| 589928 ||  || — || November 10, 2010 || Mount Lemmon || Mount Lemmon Survey ||  || align=right | 2.9 km || 
|-id=929 bgcolor=#d6d6d6
| 589929 ||  || — || November 8, 2010 || Kitt Peak || Spacewatch ||  || align=right | 2.9 km || 
|-id=930 bgcolor=#C2FFFF
| 589930 ||  || — || November 5, 2010 || Mount Lemmon || Mount Lemmon Survey || L4 || align=right | 6.2 km || 
|-id=931 bgcolor=#C2FFFF
| 589931 ||  || — || November 12, 2010 || Mount Lemmon || Mount Lemmon Survey || L4 || align=right | 8.0 km || 
|-id=932 bgcolor=#C2FFFF
| 589932 ||  || — || November 3, 2010 || Mount Lemmon || Mount Lemmon Survey || L4 || align=right | 6.8 km || 
|-id=933 bgcolor=#d6d6d6
| 589933 ||  || — || November 4, 2010 || Mount Lemmon || Mount Lemmon Survey ||  || align=right | 2.7 km || 
|-id=934 bgcolor=#C2FFFF
| 589934 ||  || — || November 12, 2010 || Mount Lemmon || Mount Lemmon Survey || L4 || align=right | 7.4 km || 
|-id=935 bgcolor=#C2FFFF
| 589935 ||  || — || November 13, 2010 || Mount Lemmon || Mount Lemmon Survey || L4 || align=right | 7.9 km || 
|-id=936 bgcolor=#d6d6d6
| 589936 ||  || — || November 14, 2010 || Mount Lemmon || Mount Lemmon Survey ||  || align=right | 2.2 km || 
|-id=937 bgcolor=#C2FFFF
| 589937 ||  || — || November 14, 2010 || Mount Lemmon || Mount Lemmon Survey || L4 || align=right | 5.8 km || 
|-id=938 bgcolor=#C2FFFF
| 589938 ||  || — || November 8, 2010 || Mount Lemmon || Mount Lemmon Survey || L4 || align=right | 7.9 km || 
|-id=939 bgcolor=#C2FFFF
| 589939 ||  || — || November 13, 2010 || Mount Lemmon || Mount Lemmon Survey || L4 || align=right | 6.0 km || 
|-id=940 bgcolor=#C2FFFF
| 589940 ||  || — || November 1, 2010 || Mount Lemmon || Mount Lemmon Survey || L4 || align=right | 7.1 km || 
|-id=941 bgcolor=#E9E9E9
| 589941 ||  || — || November 3, 2010 || Mount Lemmon || Mount Lemmon Survey ||  || align=right | 1.1 km || 
|-id=942 bgcolor=#d6d6d6
| 589942 ||  || — || November 14, 2010 || Mount Lemmon || Mount Lemmon Survey ||  || align=right | 3.0 km || 
|-id=943 bgcolor=#fefefe
| 589943 ||  || — || November 13, 2010 || Mount Lemmon || Mount Lemmon Survey ||  || align=right data-sort-value="0.73" | 730 m || 
|-id=944 bgcolor=#d6d6d6
| 589944 Suhua ||  ||  || November 26, 2010 || Xingming || J. Ruan, X. Gao ||  || align=right | 3.5 km || 
|-id=945 bgcolor=#C2FFFF
| 589945 ||  || — || November 11, 2010 || Mount Lemmon || Mount Lemmon Survey || L4 || align=right | 7.3 km || 
|-id=946 bgcolor=#d6d6d6
| 589946 ||  || — || October 29, 2010 || Kitt Peak || Spacewatch ||  || align=right | 3.5 km || 
|-id=947 bgcolor=#C2FFFF
| 589947 ||  || — || November 11, 2010 || Kitt Peak || Spacewatch || L4 || align=right | 7.0 km || 
|-id=948 bgcolor=#C2FFFF
| 589948 ||  || — || April 1, 2003 || Apache Point || SDSS Collaboration || L4 || align=right | 10 km || 
|-id=949 bgcolor=#d6d6d6
| 589949 ||  || — || November 26, 2010 || Mount Lemmon || Mount Lemmon Survey ||  || align=right | 2.1 km || 
|-id=950 bgcolor=#d6d6d6
| 589950 ||  || — || November 11, 2010 || Mount Lemmon || Mount Lemmon Survey ||  || align=right | 2.7 km || 
|-id=951 bgcolor=#C2FFFF
| 589951 ||  || — || November 27, 2010 || Mount Lemmon || Mount Lemmon Survey || L4 || align=right | 7.1 km || 
|-id=952 bgcolor=#d6d6d6
| 589952 ||  || — || November 27, 2010 || Mount Lemmon || Mount Lemmon Survey ||  || align=right | 2.1 km || 
|-id=953 bgcolor=#d6d6d6
| 589953 ||  || — || November 14, 2010 || Sandlot || G. Hug ||  || align=right | 3.9 km || 
|-id=954 bgcolor=#d6d6d6
| 589954 ||  || — || November 27, 2010 || Palomar || PTF ||  || align=right | 2.8 km || 
|-id=955 bgcolor=#d6d6d6
| 589955 ||  || — || February 3, 2012 || Mount Lemmon || Mount Lemmon Survey ||  || align=right | 2.8 km || 
|-id=956 bgcolor=#d6d6d6
| 589956 ||  || — || April 4, 2013 || Haleakala || Pan-STARRS ||  || align=right | 2.6 km || 
|-id=957 bgcolor=#d6d6d6
| 589957 ||  || — || May 28, 2014 || Mount Lemmon || Mount Lemmon Survey ||  || align=right | 2.1 km || 
|-id=958 bgcolor=#C2FFFF
| 589958 ||  || — || November 25, 2010 || Mount Lemmon || Mount Lemmon Survey || L4 || align=right | 6.3 km || 
|-id=959 bgcolor=#fefefe
| 589959 ||  || — || October 31, 2006 || Mount Lemmon || Mount Lemmon Survey ||  || align=right data-sort-value="0.75" | 750 m || 
|-id=960 bgcolor=#d6d6d6
| 589960 ||  || — || November 4, 2010 || Mount Lemmon || Mount Lemmon Survey || 7:4 || align=right | 3.2 km || 
|-id=961 bgcolor=#d6d6d6
| 589961 ||  || — || November 12, 2010 || Kitt Peak || Spacewatch ||  || align=right | 2.4 km || 
|-id=962 bgcolor=#C2FFFF
| 589962 ||  || — || December 2, 2010 || Mount Lemmon || Mount Lemmon Survey || L4 || align=right | 6.8 km || 
|-id=963 bgcolor=#E9E9E9
| 589963 ||  || — || October 2, 2005 || Mount Lemmon || Mount Lemmon Survey ||  || align=right | 1.4 km || 
|-id=964 bgcolor=#C2FFFF
| 589964 ||  || — || December 4, 2010 || Piszkesteto || Z. Kuli, K. Sárneczky || L4 || align=right | 7.4 km || 
|-id=965 bgcolor=#d6d6d6
| 589965 ||  || — || December 6, 2010 || Zelenchukskaya Stn || T. V. Kryachko, B. Satovski ||  || align=right | 2.7 km || 
|-id=966 bgcolor=#d6d6d6
| 589966 ||  || — || March 18, 2007 || Nyukasa || H. Kurosaki, A. Nakajima || VER || align=right | 2.9 km || 
|-id=967 bgcolor=#E9E9E9
| 589967 ||  || — || November 13, 2010 || Mount Lemmon || Mount Lemmon Survey ||  || align=right data-sort-value="0.79" | 790 m || 
|-id=968 bgcolor=#C2FFFF
| 589968 ||  || — || November 1, 2010 || Kitt Peak || Spacewatch || L4 || align=right | 8.8 km || 
|-id=969 bgcolor=#fefefe
| 589969 ||  || — || August 20, 2006 || Palomar || NEAT || NYS || align=right data-sort-value="0.56" | 560 m || 
|-id=970 bgcolor=#d6d6d6
| 589970 ||  || — || December 3, 2010 || Mount Lemmon || Mount Lemmon Survey ||  || align=right | 2.2 km || 
|-id=971 bgcolor=#C2FFFF
| 589971 ||  || — || November 2, 2010 || Mount Lemmon || Mount Lemmon Survey || L4 || align=right | 6.7 km || 
|-id=972 bgcolor=#d6d6d6
| 589972 ||  || — || January 26, 2012 || Mount Lemmon || Mount Lemmon Survey ||  || align=right | 2.4 km || 
|-id=973 bgcolor=#d6d6d6
| 589973 ||  || — || July 25, 2015 || Haleakala || Pan-STARRS ||  || align=right | 2.6 km || 
|-id=974 bgcolor=#E9E9E9
| 589974 ||  || — || December 14, 2010 || Mount Lemmon || Mount Lemmon Survey ||  || align=right data-sort-value="0.80" | 800 m || 
|-id=975 bgcolor=#E9E9E9
| 589975 ||  || — || December 9, 2010 || Kitt Peak || Spacewatch ||  || align=right data-sort-value="0.75" | 750 m || 
|-id=976 bgcolor=#d6d6d6
| 589976 ||  || — || December 2, 2010 || Mount Lemmon || Mount Lemmon Survey ||  || align=right | 2.6 km || 
|-id=977 bgcolor=#d6d6d6
| 589977 ||  || — || December 5, 2010 || Mount Lemmon || Mount Lemmon Survey ||  || align=right | 2.9 km || 
|-id=978 bgcolor=#d6d6d6
| 589978 ||  || — || December 25, 2010 || Mount Lemmon || Mount Lemmon Survey ||  || align=right | 2.3 km || 
|-id=979 bgcolor=#fefefe
| 589979 ||  || — || August 15, 2013 || Haleakala || Pan-STARRS ||  || align=right data-sort-value="0.73" | 730 m || 
|-id=980 bgcolor=#fefefe
| 589980 ||  || — || November 24, 2002 || Palomar || NEAT || NYS || align=right data-sort-value="0.68" | 680 m || 
|-id=981 bgcolor=#fefefe
| 589981 ||  || — || January 2, 2011 || Mount Lemmon || Mount Lemmon Survey ||  || align=right data-sort-value="0.68" | 680 m || 
|-id=982 bgcolor=#fefefe
| 589982 ||  || — || July 28, 2005 || Palomar || NEAT ||  || align=right | 1.4 km || 
|-id=983 bgcolor=#d6d6d6
| 589983 ||  || — || December 2, 2010 || Mayhill-ISON || L. Elenin ||  || align=right | 2.8 km || 
|-id=984 bgcolor=#d6d6d6
| 589984 ||  || — || November 1, 2010 || Kitt Peak || Spacewatch ||  || align=right | 4.3 km || 
|-id=985 bgcolor=#d6d6d6
| 589985 ||  || — || October 17, 2010 || Mount Lemmon || Mount Lemmon Survey ||  || align=right | 3.2 km || 
|-id=986 bgcolor=#d6d6d6
| 589986 ||  || — || October 13, 2004 || Kitt Peak || Spacewatch ||  || align=right | 3.5 km || 
|-id=987 bgcolor=#fefefe
| 589987 ||  || — || November 7, 2002 || Kitt Peak || Spacewatch ||  || align=right | 1.2 km || 
|-id=988 bgcolor=#fefefe
| 589988 ||  || — || January 12, 2011 || ESA OGS || ESA OGS ||  || align=right data-sort-value="0.92" | 920 m || 
|-id=989 bgcolor=#fefefe
| 589989 ||  || — || December 13, 2006 || Kitt Peak || Spacewatch ||  || align=right data-sort-value="0.57" | 570 m || 
|-id=990 bgcolor=#d6d6d6
| 589990 ||  || — || January 13, 2011 || Kitt Peak || Spacewatch ||  || align=right | 3.1 km || 
|-id=991 bgcolor=#E9E9E9
| 589991 ||  || — || January 10, 2011 || Kitt Peak || Spacewatch ||  || align=right data-sort-value="0.88" | 880 m || 
|-id=992 bgcolor=#fefefe
| 589992 ||  || — || August 12, 2013 || Haleakala || Pan-STARRS ||  || align=right data-sort-value="0.64" | 640 m || 
|-id=993 bgcolor=#fefefe
| 589993 ||  || — || October 12, 2013 || Mount Lemmon || Mount Lemmon Survey ||  || align=right data-sort-value="0.56" | 560 m || 
|-id=994 bgcolor=#d6d6d6
| 589994 ||  || — || January 14, 2011 || Mount Lemmon || Mount Lemmon Survey ||  || align=right | 1.6 km || 
|-id=995 bgcolor=#E9E9E9
| 589995 ||  || — || January 12, 2011 || Mount Lemmon || Mount Lemmon Survey ||  || align=right data-sort-value="0.70" | 700 m || 
|-id=996 bgcolor=#E9E9E9
| 589996 ||  || — || January 24, 2011 || Alder Springs || K. Levin ||  || align=right data-sort-value="0.72" | 720 m || 
|-id=997 bgcolor=#E9E9E9
| 589997 ||  || — || January 24, 2011 || Kitt Peak || Spacewatch ||  || align=right | 1.5 km || 
|-id=998 bgcolor=#fefefe
| 589998 ||  || — || January 25, 2011 || Kitt Peak || Spacewatch ||  || align=right data-sort-value="0.71" | 710 m || 
|-id=999 bgcolor=#E9E9E9
| 589999 ||  || — || August 23, 2004 || Kitt Peak || Spacewatch ||  || align=right data-sort-value="0.74" | 740 m || 
|-id=000 bgcolor=#E9E9E9
| 590000 ||  || — || August 21, 2004 || Siding Spring || SSS ||  || align=right | 1.3 km || 
|}

References

External links 
 Discovery Circumstances: Numbered Minor Planets (585001)–(590000) (IAU Minor Planet Center)

0589